International Business Machines (IBM) is a multinational computer technology and IT consulting corporation headquartered in Armonk, New York, United States. IBM originated from the unification of several companies that worked to automate routine business transactions, including the first companies to build punched card based data tabulating machines and to build time clocks. In 1911, these companies were amalgamated into the Computing-Tabulating-Recording Company (CTR).

Thomas J. Watson (1874–1956) joined the company in 1914 as General Manager, and became its President in 1915. In 1924, the company changed its name to "International Business Machines." IBM expanded into electric typewriters and other office machines. Watson was a salesman whose goal was to build a highly motivated, very well paid sales force that could craft solutions for clients unfamiliar with the latest technology.

IBM's first experiments with computers in the 1940s and 1950s were modest advances on the card-based system. Its breakthrough came in the 1960s with its System/360 family of mainframe computers. IBM offered a full range of hardware, software, and service agreements, so that users, as their needs grew, would stay with IBM (aka "Big Blue.") Since most end-user software was custom-written by in-house programmers and would run on only one brand of computers, it was expensive to switch brands. Brushing off clone makers (aka plug-compatible hardware systems), such as Amdahl, and facing down a federal anti-trust suit, the company sold reputation and security as well as hardware and system software and was one of the most admired American corporations of the 1970s and 1980s.

IBM struggled in the late 1980s to 1990slosses in 1993 exceeded $8 billionas the mainframe corporation failed to adjust quickly enough to the Unix open systems and personal computer revolutions. Desktop machines and Unix midrange computers had the power needed and were easier and less expensive for both users and managers than multi-million-dollar mainframes. IBM introduced a Unix line and a line of personal computers. Clone makers undersold IBM, while the profits went to chip manufacturers like Intel or software corporations like Microsoft.

After a series of reorganizations, IBM remains one of the world's largest computer companies and systems integrators. With over 400,000 employees worldwide as of 2014, IBM holds more patents than any other U.S. based technology company and has twelve research laboratories worldwide. The company has scientists, engineers, consultants, and sales professionals in over 175 countries. IBM employees have earned five Nobel Prizes, four Turing Awards, five National Medals of Technology, and five National Medals of Science.

Chronology

1880s–1924: The origin of IBM

 
The roots of IBM date back to the 1880s, tracing from four predecessor companies:
 The Bundy Manufacturing Company was the first manufacturer of time clocks. The company was founded in 1889 by Harlow Bundy in Binghamton, New York.
 The Tabulating Machine Company was the first manufacturer of punch card based data processing machines. Herman Hollerith started building the machines as early as 1884, and founded the Tabulating Machine Company in 1896 in Washington, D.C.
 The International Time Recording Company was founded in 1900 by George Winthrop Fairchild in Jersey City, New Jersey, and reincorporated in 1901 in Binghamton. The company relocated in 1906 to nearby Endicott, New York.
 The Computing Scale Company of America was founded in 1901 in Dayton, Ohio.

On June 16, 1911, these four companies were amalgamated into a new holding company named the Computing-Tabulating-Recording Company (CTR), based in Endicott. The amalgamation was engineered by noted financier Charles Flint. Flint remained a member of the board of CTR until his retirement in 1930. At the time of the amalgamation, CTR had 1,300 employees and offices and plants in Endicott and Binghamton, New York; Dayton, Ohio; Detroit, Michigan; Washington, D.C.; and Toronto, Ontario.

After amalgamation, the individual companies continued to operate using their established names, as subsidiaries of CTR, until the holding company was eliminated in 1933. The divisions manufactured a wide range of products, including employee time-keeping systems, weighing scales, automatic meat slicers, coffee grinders, and punched card equipment. The product lines were very different; Flint stated that the "allied" consolidation:

 ...instead of being dependent for earnings upon a single industry, would own three separate and distinct lines of business, so that in normal times the interest and sinking funds on its bonds could be earned by any one of these independent lines, while in abnormal times the consolidation would have three chances instead of one to meet its obligations and pay dividends.

Of the companies amalgamated to form CTR, the most technologically significant was The Tabulating Machine Company, founded by Herman Hollerith, and specialized in the development of punched card data processing equipment. Hollerith's series of patents on tabulating machine technology, first applied for in 1884, drew on his work at the U.S. Census Bureau from 1879–82. Hollerith was initially trying to reduce the time and complexity needed to tabulate the 1890 Census. His development of punched cards in 1886 set the industry standard for the next 80 years of tabulating and computing data input.

In 1896, The Tabulating Machine Company leased some machines to a railway company but quickly focused on the challenges of the largest statistical endeavor of its day – the 1900 US Census. After winning the government contract, and completing the project, Hollerith was faced with the challenge of sustaining the company in non-Census years. He returned to targeting private businesses in the United States and abroad, attempting to identify industry applications for his automatic punching, tabulating and sorting machines. In 1911, Hollerith, now 51 and in failing health sold the business to Flint for $2.3 million (of which Hollerith got $1.2 million), who then founded CTR.

When the diversified businesses of CTR proved difficult to manage, Flint turned for help to the former No. 2 executive at the National Cash Register Company (NCR), Thomas J. Watson Sr. Watson became General Manager of CTR in 1914 and President in 1915. By drawing upon his managerial experience at NCR, Watson quickly implemented a series of effective business tactics: generous sales incentives, a focus on customer service, an insistence on well-groomed, dark-suited salesmen, and an evangelical fervor for instilling company pride and loyalty in every worker. As the sales force grew into a professional and knowledgeable arm of the company, Watson focused their attention on providing large-scale tabulating solutions for businesses, leaving the market for small office products to others. He also stressed the importance of the customer. The strategy proved successful, as, during Watson's first four years, revenues doubled to $2 million, and company operations expanded to Europe, South America, Asia, and Australia.

At the helm during this period, Watson played a central role in establishing what would become the IBM organization and culture. He launched a number of initiatives that demonstrated an unwavering faith in his workers. He hired the company's first disabled worker in 1914, he formed the company's first employee education department in 1916 and in 1915 he introduced his favorite slogan, "THINK", which quickly became the corporate mantra. Watson boosted company spirit by encouraging any employee with a complaint to approach him or any other company executive – widely known as the Open Door policy. He also sponsored employee sports teams, family outings, and a company band, believing that employees were most productive when they were supported by healthy and supportive families and communities. These initiatives – each deeply rooted in Watson's personal values system – became core aspects of IBM culture for the remainder of the century.

On February 14, 1924, the name was formally changed to International Business Machines.

Key events

1890–1895: Hollerith's punched cards used for 1890 Census. The U.S. Census Bureau contracts to use Herman Hollerith's punched card tabulating technology on the 1890 United States Census. That census was completed in 6-years and estimated to have saved the government $5 million. The prior, 1880, census had required 8-years. The years required are not directly comparable; the two differed in: population size, data collected, resources (census bureau headcount, machines, ...), and reports prepared. The total population of 62,947,714, the family, or rough, count, was announced after only six weeks of processing (punched cards were not used for this tabulation). Hollerith's punched cards become the tabulating industry standard for input for the next 70 years. Hollerith's The Tabulating Machine Company is later consolidated into what becomes IBM.
1906: Hollerith Type I Tabulator. The first tabulator with an automatic card feed and control panel.
1911: Formation. Charles Flint, a trust organizer, engineers the amalgamation of four companies: The Tabulating Machine Company, the International Time Recording Company, the Computing Scale Company of America, and the Bundy Manufacturing Company. The amalgamated companies manufacture and sell or lease machinery such as commercial scales, industrial time recorders, meat and cheese slicers, tabulators, and punched cards. The new holding company, Computing-Tabulating-Recording Company, is based in Endicott. Including the amalgamated subsidiaries, CTR had 1,300 employees with offices and plants in Endicott and Binghamton, New York; Dayton, Ohio; Detroit, Michigan; and Washington, D.C.
1914: Thomas J. Watson arrives. Thomas J. Watson Sr., a one-year jail sentence pending – see NCR – is made general manager of CTR. Less than a year later the court verdict was set aside. A consent decree was drawn up which Watson refused to sign, gambling that there would not be a retrial. He becomes president of the firm Monday, March 15, 1915.
1914: First disabled employee. CTR companies hire their first disabled employee.
1915: "THINK" signs. "THINK" signs, based on the slogan coined by Thomas J. Watson Sr. while at NCR and promoted by John Henry Patterson (NCR owner) are used in the companies for the first time.
1916: Employee education. CTR invests in its subsidiary's employees, creating an education program. Over the next two decades, the program would expand to include management education, volunteer study clubs, and the construction of the IBM Schoolhouse in 1933.
1917: CTR in Brazil. Premiered in Brazil in 1917, invited by the Brazilian Government to conduct the census, CTR opened an office in Brazil

1920: First Tabulating Machine Co. printing tabulator. With prior tabulators the results were displayed and had to be copied by hand.
1923: CTR Germany. CTR acquires majority ownership of the German tabulating firm Deutsche Hollerith Maschinen Groupe (Dehomag).
1924: International Business Machines Corporation. Watson had never liked the hyphenated title of Computing-Tabulating-Recording Company and chose the new name both for its aspirations and to escape the confines of "office appliance". The new name was first used for the company's Canadian subsidiary in 1917. On February 14, 1924, CTR's name was formally changed to International Business Machines Corporation (IBM). The subsidiaries' names did not change; there would be no IBM labeled products until 1933 (below) when the subsidiaries are merged into IBM.

1925–1929: IBM's early growth

Watson mandated strict rules for employees, including a dress code of dark suits, white shirts and striped ties, and no alcohol, whether working or not. He led the singing at meetings of songs such as "Ever Onward" from the official IBM songbook. The company launched an employee newspaper, Business Machines, which unified coverage of all of IBM's businesses under one publication. IBM introduced the Quarter Century Club, to honor employees with 25 years of service to the company, and launched the Hundred Percent Club, to reward sales personnel who met their annual quotas. In 1928, the Suggestion Plan program – which granted cash rewards to employees who contributed viable ideas on how to improve IBM products and procedures – made its debut.

IBM and its predecessor companies made clocks and other time recording products for 70 years, culminating in the 1958 sale of the IBM Time Equipment Division to Simplex Time Recorder Company. IBM manufactured and sold such equipment as dial recorders, job recorders, recording door locks, time stamps and traffic recorders.

The company also expanded its product line through innovative engineering. Behind a core group of inventors – James W. Bryce, Clair Lake, Fred Carroll, and Royden Pierce – IBM produced a series of significant product innovations.

In 1920, the company introduced the first complete school time control system, and its first printing tabulator. Three years later the company introduced the first electric keypunch. 1924's Carroll Rotary Press produced punched cards at record setting speeds. In 1928, the company held its first customer engineering education class. It also introduced the 80-column punched card in 1928, which doubled its information capacity. This new format, soon dubbed the "IBM Card", became and remained an industry standard until the 1970s.

Key events

1925: First tabulator sold to Japan. In May 1925, Morimura-Brothers entered into a sole agency agreement with IBM to import Hollerith tabulators into Japan. The first Hollerith tabulator in Japan was installed at Nippon Pottery (now Noritake) in September 1925, making it IBM customer #1 in Japan.

1927: IBM Italy. IBM opens its first office in Italy in Milan, and starts selling and operating with National Insurance and Banks.
1928: A Tabulator that can subtract, Columbia University, 80-column card. The first Hollerith tabulator that could subtract was the Hollerith Type IV tabulator. IBM begins its collaboration with Benjamin Wood, Wallace John Eckert and the Statistical Bureau at Columbia University. The Hollerith 80-column punched card is introduced. Its rectangular holes are patented, ending vendor compatibility (of the prior 45 column card; Remington Rand would soon introduce a 90 column card).

1930–1938: The Great Depression

The Great Depression of the 1930s presented an unprecedented economic challenge. The company continued investing in people, manufacturing, and technological innovation despite the difficult economic times. Rather than reduce staff, Watson hired additional employees in support of President Franklin Roosevelt's National Recovery Administration plan – including salesmen and engineers.

During this time, IBM was among the first corporations to provide group life insurance (1934), survivor benefits (1935), and paid vacations (1936). The company also opened the IBM Schoolhouse in Endicott to provide education and training for IBM employees and increased IBM's research capabilities by building a modern research laboratory on the Endicott manufacturing site.

With these internal investments, Watson was, in essence, gambling on the future. It was IBM's first 'Bet the Company' gamble. IBM factories were running at capacity for six years with no market to sell to, creating a huge inventory of unused tabulating equipment, straining IBM's resources. To reduce the cash drain, the struggling Dayton Scale Division (the food services equipment business) was sold in 1933 to Hobart Manufacturing for stock. When the Social Security Act of 1935 – labeled as "the biggest accounting operation of all time" – came up for bid, IBM was the only bidder that could quickly provide the necessary equipment. Watson's gamble brought the company a landmark government contract to maintain employment records for 26 million people.  IBM's successful performance on the contract soon led to other government orders, and by the end of the decade, IBM had not only safely negotiated the Depression but risen to the forefront of the industry. Watson's Depression-era decision to invest heavily in technical development and sales capabilities, education to expand the breadth of those capabilities, and his commitment to the data processing product line laid the foundation for 50 years of IBM growth and successes.

Watson's focus on international expansion proved an equally key component of the company's 20th-century growth and success. Having witnessed the havoc the First World War wrought on society and business, he envisioned commerce as an obstacle to war. He saw business interests and peace as being mutually compatible. In fact, he felt so strongly about the connection between the two that he had his slogan "World Peace Through World Trade" carved into the exterior of IBM's new World Headquarters (1938) in New York City. The slogan became an IBM business mantra, and Watson campaigned for the concept with global business and government leaders. He served as an informal, unofficial government host for world leaders when they visited New York, and received numerous awards from foreign governments for his efforts to improve international relations through the formation of business ties.

Key events

 1931: The first Hollerith punched card machine that could multiply, the first Hollerith alphabetical accounting machine. The Hollerith 600 Multiplying Punch. The first Hollerith alphabetical accounting machine – although not a complete alphabet, the Alphabetic Tabulator Model B was quickly followed by the full alphabet ATC.
 1931: Super Computing Machine. The term Super Computing Machine is used by the New York World newspaper to describe the Columbia Difference Tabulator, a one-of-a-kind special purpose tabulator-based machine made for the Columbia Statistical Bureau, a machine so massive it was nicknamed Packard. The Packard attracted users from across the country: "the Carnegie Foundation, Yale University, Pittsburgh, University of Chicago, Ohio State University, Harvard University, California and Princeton University."
 1933: Subsidiary companies are merged into IBM. The Tabulating Machine Company name, and others, disappear as subsidiary companies are merged into IBM.
 1933: Removable control panels. IBM introduces removable control panels.
 1933: 40-hour week. IBM introduces the 40-hour week for both manufacturing and office locations.
 1933: Electromatic Typewriter Co. purchased. Purchased primarily to get important patents safely into IBM hands, electric typewriters would become one of IBM's most widely known products. By 1958 IBM was deriving 8% of its revenue from the sale of electric typewriters.
 1934 – Group life insurance. IBM creates a group life insurance plan for all employees with at least one year of service.
 1934: Elimination of piece work. Watson Sr., places IBM's factory employees on salary, eliminating piece work and providing employees and their families with an added degree of economic stability.
 1934: IBM 801. The IBM 801 Bank Proof machine to clear bank checks is introduced. A new type of proof machine, the 801 lists and separates checks, endorses them, and records totals thereby improving the efficiency of the check clearing process.
 1935: Social Security Administration. During the Great Depression, IBM keeps its factories producing new machines even while demand is slack. When Congress passes the Social Security Act in 1935, IBM – with its overstocked inventory – is consequently positioned to win the landmark government contract, which is called "the biggest accounting operation of all time."
 1936: Supreme Court rules IBM can only set punched card specifications. IBM initially required that its customers use only IBM manufactured cards with IBM machines, which were leased, not sold. IBM claimed that it viewed its business as providing a service and that the cards were part of the machine. In 1932 the government took IBM to court on this issue. IBM fought all the way to the Supreme Court and lost in 1936; the court ruling that IBM could only set card specifications.
 1937: Scientific computing. The tabulating machine data center established at Columbia University, dedicated to scientific research, is named the Thomas J. Watson Astronomical Computing Bureau.
 1937: The first collator, the IBM 077 Collator.
 1937: IBM produces 5 to 10 million punched cards every day. By 1937... IBM had 32 presses at work in Endicott, N.Y., printing, cutting and stacking five to 10 million punched cards every day.
 1937: IBM 805 test scoring machine. IBM's Rey Johnson designs the IBM 805 Test Scoring Machine to greatly speed the process of test scoring. The 805's innovative pencil-mark sensing technology gives rise to the ubiquitous phrase, "Please completely fill in the oval".
 1937: Berlin conference. As president of the International Chamber of Commerce, Watson Sr., presides over the ICC's 9th Congress in Berlin. While there he accepts a Merit Cross of the German Eagle with Star medal from the Nazi government honoring his activities on behalf of world peace and international trade (he later returned it).
 1937: Paid holidays, paid vacation. IBM announces a policy of paying employees for six annual holidays and becomes one of the first U.S. companies to grant holiday pay. Paid vacations also begin.
 1937: IBM Japan. Japan Wattoson Statistics Accounting Machinery Co., Ltd. (日本ワットソン統計会計機械株式会社, now IBM Japan) was established.
 1938: New headquarters. When IBM dedicates its new World Headquarters at 590 Madison Avenue, New York, New York, in January 1938, the company has operations in 79 countries.

1939–1945: World War II

In the decades leading up to the onset of WW2 IBM had operations in many countries that would be involved in the war, on both the side of the Allies and the Axis. IBM had a lucrative subsidiary in Germany, which it was the majority owner of, as well as operations in Poland, Switzerland, and other countries in Europe. As with most other enemy-owned businesses in Axis countries, these subsidiaries were taken over by the Nazis and other Axis governments early on in the war. The headquarters in New York meanwhile worked to help the American war effort.

IBM in America 

IBM's product line shifted from tabulating equipment and time recording devices to Sperry and Norden bombsights, Browning Automatic Rifles and the M1 Carbine, and engine parts – in all, more than three dozen major ordnance items and 70 products overall. Watson set a nominal one percent profit on those products and used the profits to establish a fund for widows and orphans of IBM employee war casualties.

Allied military forces widely used IBM's tabulating equipment for mobile records units, ballistics, accounting and logistics, and other war-related purposes. There was extensive use of IBM punched-card machines for calculations made at Los Alamos National Laboratory during the Manhattan Project for developing the first atomic bombs. During the War, IBM also built the Automatic Sequence Controlled Calculator, also known as the Harvard Mark I for the U.S. Navy – the first large-scale electromechanical calculator in the U.S..

In 1933 IBM had acquired the rights to Radiotype, an IBM Electric typewriter attached to a radio transmitter. "In 1935 Admiral Richard E. Byrd successfully sent a test Radiotype message 11,000 miles from Antarctica to an IBM receiving station in Ridgewood, New Jersey" Selected by the Signal Corps for use during the war, Radiotype installations handled up to 50,000,000 words a day.

To meet wartime product demands, IBM greatly expanded its manufacturing capacity. IBM added new buildings at its Endicott, New York plant (1941), and opened new facilities in Poughkeepsie, New York (1941), Washington, D.C. (1942), and San Jose, California (1943). IBM's decision to establish a presence on the West Coast took advantage of the growing base of electronics research and other high technology innovation in the southern part of the San Francisco Bay Area, an area that came to be known decades later as Silicon Valley.

IBM was, at the request of the government, the subcontractor for the Japanese internment camps' punched card project.

IBM punched card equipment was used for cryptanalysis (code breaking) by US Army and Navy organizations, Arlington Hall and OP-20-G and similar Allied organizations, including the (Central Bureau and the Far East Combined Bureau).

IBM in Germany and Nazi-occupied Europe 

The Nazis made extensive use of Hollerith equipment and IBM's majority-owned German subsidiary, Deutsche Hollerith Maschinen GmbH (Dehomag), supplied this equipment from the early 1930s. This equipment was critical to Nazi efforts to categorize citizens of both Germany and other nations that fell under Nazi control through ongoing censuses. This census data was used to facilitate the round-up of Jews and other targeted groups, and to catalog their movements through the machinery of the Holocaust, including internment in the concentration camps.

As with hundreds of foreign-owned companies that did business in Germany at that time, Dehomag came under the control of Nazi authorities prior to and during World War II. A Nazi, Hermann Fellinger, was appointed by the Germans as an enemy-property custodian and placed at the head of the Dehomag subsidiary.

Journalist and historian Edwin Black asserts in IBM and the Holocaust that the seizure of the German subsidiary was a ruse. He writes, "The company was not looted, its leased machines were not seized, and [IBM] continued to receive money funneled through its subsidiary in Geneva." In his book he argues that IBM was a supplier to the Nazi regime long after they should have stopped dealing with them. IBM continued to service and expand services to the Third Reich until the seizure of Dehomag after the 1941 United States Declaration of War with Germany.

IBM responded that the book was based upon "well-known" facts and documents that it had previously made publicly available and that there were no new facts or findings. IBM also denied withholding any relevant documents. Writing in the New York Times, Richard Bernstein argued that Black overstates IBM's culpability. Other historians also argue about IBM's implicit knowledge and even Nazi use of tabulating machines in the manner that Black claims.

Key events

 1942: Training for the disabled. IBM launches a program to train and employ disabled people in Topeka, Kansas. The next year classes begin in New York City, and soon the company is asked to join the President's Committee for Employment of the Handicapped.
 1943: First female vice president. IBM appoints its first female vice president.
 1944: ASCC. IBM introduces the world's first large-scale calculating computer, the Automatic Sequence Control Calculator (ASCC). Designed in collaboration with Harvard University, the ASCC, also known as the Mark I, uses electromechanical relays to solve addition problems in less than a second, multiplication in six seconds, and division in 12 seconds.
 1944:  United Negro College Fund. IBM President Thomas J. Watson Sr., joins the Advisory Committee of the United Negro College Fund (UNCF), and IBM contributes to the UNCF's fund-raising efforts.
 1945:  IBM's first research lab. IBM's first research facility, the Watson Scientific Computing Laboratory, opens in a renovated fraternity house near Columbia University in Manhattan. In 1961, IBM moves its research headquarters to the T.J. Watson Research Center in Yorktown Heights, New York.

1946–1959: Postwar recovery, rise of business computing, space exploration, the Cold War

IBM had expanded so much by the end of the War that the company faced a potentially difficult situation – what would happen if military spending dropped sharply? One way IBM addressed that concern was to accelerate its international growth in the years after the war, culminating with the formation of the World Trade Corporation in 1949 to manage and grow its foreign operations. Under the leadership of Watson's youngest son, Arthur K. 'Dick' Watson, the WTC would produce half of IBM's bottom line by the 1970s.

Despite introducing its first computer a year after Remington Rand's UNIVAC in 1951, within five years IBM had 85% of the market. A UNIVAC executive complained that "It doesn't do much good to build a better mousetrap if the other guy selling mousetraps has five times as many salesmen". With the death of Founding Father Thomas J. Watson Sr. on June 19, 1956 at age 82, IBM experienced its first leadership change in more than four decades. The mantle of chief executive fell to his eldest son, Thomas J. Watson, Jr., IBM's president since 1952.

The new chief executive faced a daunting task. The company was in the midst of a period of rapid technological change, with nascent computer technologies – electronic computers, magnetic tape storage, disk drives, programming – creating new competitors and market uncertainties. Internally, the company was growing by leaps and bounds, creating organizational pressures and significant management challenges. Lacking the force of personality that Watson Sr. had long used to bind IBM together, Watson Jr. and his senior executives privately wondered if the new generation of leadership was up to the challenge of managing the company through this period. "We are," wrote one longtime IBM executive in 1956, "in grave danger of losing our "eternal" values that are as valid in electronic days as in mechanical counter days."

Watson Jr. responded by drastically restructuring the organization mere months after his father died, creating a modern management structure that enabled him to more effectively oversee the company. He codified well known but unwritten IBM practices and philosophy into formal corporate policies and programs – such as IBM's Three Basic Beliefs, and Open Door and Speak Up! Perhaps the most significant of which was his shepherding of the company's first equal opportunity policy letter in 1953, one year before the U.S. Supreme Court decision in Brown vs. Board of Education and 11 years before the Civil Rights Act of 1964.

He continued to expand the company's physical capabilities – in 1952 IBM San Jose launched a storage development laboratory that pioneered disk drives. Major facilities would later follow in Rochester, Minnesota; Greencastle, Indiana; Kingston, New York; and Lexington, Kentucky. Concerned that IBM was too slow in adapting transistor technology Watson requested a corporate policy regarding their use, resulting in this 1957 product development policy statement: "It shall be the policy of IBM to use solid-state circuitry in all machine developments. Furthermore, no new commercial machines or devices shall be announced which make primary use of tube circuitry."

Watson Jr. also continued to partner with the United States government to drive computational innovation. The emergence of the Cold War accelerated the government's growing awareness of the significance of digital computing and drove Department of Defense supported computer development projects in the 1950s, including the SAGE interceptor early detection air defense system.

In 1952, IBM began working with MIT's Lincoln Laboratory to finalize the design of an air defense computer. The merger of academic and business engineering cultures proved troublesome, but the two organizations finally hammered out a design by the summer of 1953, and IBM was awarded the contract to build two prototypes in September. In 1954, IBM was named as the primary computer hardware contractor for developing SAGE for the United States Air Force. Working on this computing and communications system, IBM gained access to pioneering research being done at Massachusetts Institute of Technology on the first real-time, digital computer. This included working on additional computer technology advancements such as magnetic core memory, a real-time operating system, an integrated video display, light guns, the first effective algebraic computer language, analog-to-digital and digital-to-analog conversion techniques, digital data transmission over telephone lines, duplexing, multiprocessing, and geographically distributed networks. IBM built fifty-six SAGE computers at the price of US$30 million each, and at the peak of the project devoted more than 7,000 employees (20% of its workforce) to the project. SAGE had the largest computer footprint ever and continued in service until 1984.

More valuable to IBM in the long run than the profits from governmental projects was the access to cutting-edge research into digital computers being done under military auspices. IBM neglected, however, to gain an even more dominant role in the nascent industry by allowing the RAND Corporation to take over the job of programming the new computers, because, according to one project participant, Robert P. Crago, "we couldn't imagine where we could absorb two thousand programmers at IBM when this job would be over someday, which shows how well we were understanding the future at that time." IBM would use its experience designing massive, integrated real-time networks with SAGE to design its SABRE airline reservation system, which met with much success.

These government partnerships, combined with pioneering computer technology research and a series of commercially successful products (IBM's 700 series of computer systems, the IBM 650, the IBM 305 RAMAC with disk drive memory, and the IBM 1401) enabled IBM to emerge from the 1950s as the world's leading technology firm.

In the five years since the passing of Watson Sr., IBM was two and a half times bigger, its stock had quintupled, and of the 6000 computers in operation in the United States, more than 4000 were IBM machines.

Key events

 1946: IBM 603. IBM announces the IBM 603 Electronic Multiplier, the first commercial product to incorporate electronic arithmetic circuits. The 603 used vacuum tubes to perform multiplication far more rapidly than earlier electromechanical devices. It had begun its development as part of a program to make a "super calculator" that would perform faster than 1944's IBM ASCC by using electronics.
 1946: Chinese character typewriter. IBM introduces an electric Chinese ideographic character typewriter, which allowed an experienced user to type at a rate of 40 to 45 Chinese words a minute. The machine used a cylinder on which 5,400 ideographic type faces were engraved.
 1946: First black salesman. IBM hires its first black salesman, 18 years before the Civil Rights Act of 1964.
 1948:  IBM SSEC. IBM's first large-scale digital calculating machine, the Selective Sequence Electronic Calculator, is announced. The SSEC is the first computer that can modify a stored program and featured 12,000 vacuum tubes and 21,000 electromechanical relays.
 1950s: Space exploration. From developing ballistics tables during World War II to the design and development of intercontinental missiles to the launching and tracking of satellites to manned lunar and shuttle space flights, IBM has been a contractor to NASA and the aerospace industry.
 1952: IBM 701. IBM enters the commerial computer business by introducing the 701, its first large-scale electronic computer to be manufactured in quantity. The 701, IBM President Thomas J. Watson Jr., later recalled, is "the machine that carried us into the electronics business."
 1952: Magnetic tape vacuum column. IBM introduces the magnetic tape drive vacuum column, making it possible for fragile magnetic tape to become a viable data storage medium. The use of the vacuum column in the IBM 701 system signals the beginning of the era of magnetic storage, as the technology is adopted throughout the industry.
 1952: First California research lab. IBM opens its first West Coast laboratory in San Jose, California: the area that decades later will come to be known as "Silicon Valley." Within four years, the lab invents the hard disk drive.
 1953: Equal opportunity policy letter. Thomas J. Watson Jr., publishes the company's first written equal opportunity policy letter: one year before the U.S. Supreme Court decision in Brown vs. Board of Education and 11 years before the Civil Rights Act of 1964.
 1953: IBM 650. IBM announces the IBM 650 Magnetic Drum Data-Processing Machine, an intermediate size electronic computer, to handle both business and scientific computations. Purchased by universities and businesses, it was the most popular computer of the 1950s. Nearly 2,000 IBM 650s were marketed by 1962.
 1954: NORC. IBM develops and builds the fastest, most powerful electronic computer of its time: the Naval Ordnance Research Computer (NORC): for the U.S. Navy Bureau of Ordnance.
 1956: First magnetic Hard disk drive. IBM introduces the world's first magnetic hard disk for data storage. The IBM 350 disk storage unit stores 5 million 6-bit characters (3.75 MB) on fifty-two 24-inch (610 mm) diameter disks. Produced in California, IBM's first hard disk stored about 2,000 bits of data per square inch and cost about $10,000 per megabyte. By 1997, the cost of storing a megabyte had dropped to around ten cents.
 1956: Consent decree. The United States Justice Department enters a consent decree against IBM to prevent the company from becoming a monopoly in the market for punched-card tabulating and, later, electronic data-processing machines. The decree requires IBM to sell its computers as well as lease them and to service and sell parts for computers that IBM no longer owned.
 1956: Corporate design. In the mid-1950s, Thomas J. Watson Jr. hired design consultant Eliot Noyes to oversee the creation of a formal Corporate Design Program and charged Noyes with creating a consistent, world-class look and feel at IBM. Over the next two decades, Noyes hired influential architects, designers, and artists to design IBM products, structures, exhibits, and graphics. The list of Noyes contacts includes Eero Saarinen, Marcel Breuer, Mies van der Rohe, John Bolles, Paul Rand, Isamu Noguchi and Alexander Calder.
 1956: First European research lab. IBM opens its first research lab outside the United States, in the Swiss city of Zurich.
 1956: Changing hands. Watson Sr. retires and hands IBM to his son, Watson Jr. Senior dies soon after.
 1956: Williamsburg conference. Watson Jr. gathered some 100 senior IBM executives together for a three-day meeting in Williamsburg, Virginia, resulting in a new organizational structure that featured a six-member corporate management committee and delegated more authority to business unit leadership. It was the first major meeting IBM had ever held without Thomas J. Watson Sr., and it marked the emergence of the second generation of IBM leadership.
 1956: Artificial intelligence. Arthur L. Samuel of IBM's Poughkeepsie, New York, laboratory programs an IBM 704 to play checkers (English draughts) using a method in which the machine can "learn" from its own experience. It is believed to be the first "self-learning" program, a demonstration of the concept of artificial intelligence.
 1957: FORTRAN. IBM revolutionizes programming with the introduction of FORTRAN (Formula Translator), which soon becomes the most widely used computer programming language for technical work. FORTRAN is still the basis for many important numerical analysis programs.
 1958: SAGE AN/FSQ-7. The SAGE (Semi-Automatic Ground Environment) AN/FSQ-7 computer is built under contract to MIT's Lincoln Laboratory for the North American Air Defense System.
 1958: IBM domestic Time Equipment Division sold to Simplex. IBM announces the sale of the domestic Time Equipment Division (clocks et al.) business to Simplex Time Recorder Company. The IBM time equipment service force will be transferred to the Electric Typewriter Division.
 1958: Open Door program. First implemented by Watson Sr., in the 1910s, the Open Door was a traditional company practice that granted employees with complaints hearings with senior executives, up to and including Watson Sr. IBM formalized this practice into policy in 1958 with the creation of the Open Door Program.
 1959: Speak up! A further example of IBM's willingness to solicit and act upon employee feedback, the Speak Up! Program was first created in San Jose, California.
 1959: IBM 1401. IBM introduces 1401, the first high-volume, stored-program, core-memory, transistorized computer. Its versatility in running enterprise applications of all kinds helped it become the most popular computer model in the world in the early 1960s.
 1959: IBM 1403. IBM introduces the 1403 chain printer, which launches the era of high-speed, high-volume impact printing. The 1403 will not be surpassed for print quality until the advent of laser printing in the 1970s.

1960–1969: The System/360 era, Unbundling software and services 

On April 7, 1964, IBM introduced the revolutionary System/360, the first large "family" of computers to use interchangeable software and peripheral equipment, a departure from IBM's existing product line of incompatible machines, each of which was designed to solve specific customer requirements. The idea of a general-purpose machine was considered a gamble at the time.  Within two years, the System/360 became the dominant mainframe computer in the marketplace and its architecture became a de facto industry standard. During this time, IBM transformed from a medium-sized maker of tabulating equipment and typewriters into the world's largest computer company.

In 1969 IBM "unbundled" software and services from hardware sales. Until this time customers did not pay for software or services separately from the high price for the hardware. Software was provided at no additional charge, generally in source code form. Services (systems engineering, education and training, system installation) were provided free of charge at the discretion of the IBM Branch office. This practice existed throughout the industry.

IBM's unbundling is widely credited with leading to the growth of the software industry. After the unbundling, IBM software was divided into two main categories: System Control Programming (SCP), which remained free to customers, and Program Products (PP), which were charged for. This transformed the customer's value proposition for computer solutions, giving a significant monetary value to something that had essentially been free. This helped enable the creation of the software industry. Similarly, IBM services were divided into two categories: general information, which remained free and provided at the discretion of IBM, and on-the-job assistance and training of customer personnel, which were subject to a separate charge and were open to non-IBM customers. This decision vastly expanded the market for independent computing services companies.

The company began four decades of Olympic sponsorship with the 1960 Winter Games in Squaw Valley, California. It became a recognized leader in corporate social responsibility, joining federal equal opportunity programs in 1962, opening an inner-city manufacturing plant in 1968, and creating a minority supplier program. It led efforts to improve data security and protect privacy. It set environmental air/water emissions standards that exceeded those dictated by law and brought all its facilities into compliance with those standards. It opened one of the world's most advanced research centers in Yorktown, New York. Its international operations produced more than half of IBM's revenues by the early 1970s. The resulting technology transfer shaped the way governments and businesses operated around the world. IBM personnel and technology played an integral role in the space program and landing the first men on the moon in 1969. In that same year, it changed the way it marketed its technology to customers, unbundling hardware from software and services, effectively starting today's software and services industry. See unbundling of software and services, below. IBM was massively profitable, with a nearly fivefold increase in revenues and earnings during the 1960s.

In 1967 Thomas John Watson Jr. announced that IBM would open a large-scale manufacturing plant at Boca Raton, Florida to produce its System/360 Model 20 midsized computer. On March 16, 1967, a headline in the Boca Raton News announced "IBM to hire 400 by year's end." The plan was for IBM to lease facilities to start making computers until the new site could be developed. A few months later, hiring began for assembly and production control trainees. IBM's Juan Rianda moved from Poughkeepsie, New York, to become the first plant manager at IBM's new Boca operations. To design its new campus, IBM commissioned architect Marcel Breuer (1902–1981), who worked closely with American architect Robert Gatje (1927–2018). In September 1967, the Boca team shipped the first IBM System/360 Model 20 to the City of Clearwater – the first computer in its production run. A year later, IBM 1130 Computing Systems were being produced and shipped. By 1970, IBM's Boca workforce grew to around 1,300 in part due to a Systems Development Engineering Laboratory being added to the division's operations.

Key events

 1961: IBM 7030 Stretch. IBM delivers its first 7030 Stretch supercomputer. Stretch falls short of its original design objectives, and is not a commercial success. But it is a product that pioneers numerous revolutionary computing technologies which are soon widely adopted by the computer industry.
 1961: Thomas J. Watson Research Center. IBM moves its research headquarters from Poughkeepsie, NY to Westchester County, NY, opening the Thomas J. Watson Research Center which remains IBM's largest research facility, centering on semiconductors, computer science, physical science, and mathematics. The lab which IBM established at Columbia University in 1945 was closed and moved to the Yorktown Heights laboratory in 1970.
 1961: IBM Selectric typewriter. IBM introduces the Selectric typewriter product line. Later Selectric models feature memory, giving rise to the concepts of word processing and desktop publishing. The machine won numerous awards for its design and functionality. Selectrics and their descendants eventually captured 75 percent of the United States market for electric typewriters used in business. IBM replaced the Selectric line with the IBM Wheelwriter in 1984 and transferred its typewriter business to the newly formed Lexmark in 1991.
 1961: Report Program Generator. IBM offers its Report Program Generator, an application that allows IBM 1401 users to produce reports. This capability was adopted throughout the industry, becoming a feature offered in subsequent generations of computers. It played an role in the introduction of computers into small businesses.
 1962: Basic beliefs. Drawing on established IBM policies, Thomas J. Watson, Jr., codifies three IBM basic beliefs: respect for the individual, customer service, and excellence.
 1962: SABRE. Two IBM 7090 mainframes formed the backbone of the SABRE reservation system for American Airlines. As the first airline reservation system to work live over phone lines, SABRE linked high-speed computers and data communications to handle seat inventory and passenger records.
 1964: IBM System/360. IBM introduces the IBM System/360 which creates a "family" of small to large computers, incorporating IBM Solid Logic Technology (SLT) microelectronics and using the same programming instructions. The concept of a compatible "family" of computers transforms the industry.
 1964: Word processing. IBM introduces the IBM Magnetic Tape Selectric Typewriter, a product that pioneered the application of magnetic recording devices to typewriting, and gave rise to desktop word processing. Referred to then as "power typing," the feature of revising stored text improved office efficiency by allowing typists to type at "rough draft" speed without the pressure of worrying about mistakes.
 1964: New corporate headquarters. IBM moves its corporate headquarters from New York City to Armonk, New York.
 1965: Gemini space flights. A 59-pound onboard IBM guidance computer is used on all Gemini space flights, including the first spaceship rendezvous. IBM scientists complete the most precise computation of the Moon's orbit and develop a fabrication technique to connect hundreds of circuits on a silicon wafer.
 1965: New York World's Fair. The IBM Pavilion at the New York World's Fair closes, having hosted more than 10 million visitors during its two-year existence.
 1966: Dynamic Random-Access Memory (DRAM). IBM invents one-transistor DRAM cells which permit major increases in memory capacity. DRAM chips become the mainstay of modern computer memory systems.
 1966: IBM System/4 Pi. IBM ships its first System/4Pi computer, designed to meet U.S. Department of Defense and NASA requirements. More than 9000 units of the 4Pi systems are delivered by the 1980s for use in the air, sea, and in space.
 1966: IBM Information Management System (IMS). IBM designed the Information Management System (IMS) with Rockwell and Caterpillar starting in 1966 for the Apollo program, where it was used to inventory the very large bill of materials (BOM) for the Saturn V moon rocket and Apollo space vehicle.
 1967: Fractal geometry. IBM researcher Benoit Mandelbrot conceives fractal geometry – the concept that seemingly irregular shapes can have identical structure at all scales. This new geometry makes it possible to mathematically describe the kinds of irregularities existing in nature. The concept greatly impacts the fields of engineering, economics, metallurgy, art, health sciences, and computer graphics and animation.
 1968: IBM Customer Information Control System (CICS). IBM introduces the CICS transaction monitor. CICS remains to this day the industry's most popular transaction monitor.
 1969: Antitrust. The United States government launches what would become a 13-year-long antitrust suit against IBM. The suit becomes a draining war of attrition, and is eventually dropped in 1982, after IBM's share of the mainframe market declined from 70% to 62%.
 1969: Unbundling. IBM adopts a new marketing policy that charges separately for most systems engineering activities, future computer programs, and customer education courses. This "unbundling" gives rise to the software and services industry.
 1969: Magnetic stripe cards. The American National Standards Institute makes the IBM-developed magnetic stripe technology a national standard, making possible new business models such as the credit card industry. Two years later, the International Organization for Standardization adopts the IBM design, making it a world standard.
 1969: First moon landing. IBM personnel and computers help NASA land the first men on the Moon.

1970–1974: The challenges of success

The Golden Decade of the 1960s was a hard act to follow, and the 1970s got off to a troubling start when CEO Thomas J. Watson Jr. suffered a heart attack and retired in 1971. For the first time since 1914 – nearly six decades – IBM would not have a Watson at the helm. Moreover, after just one leadership change over those nearly 60 years, IBM would endure two in two years. T. Vincent Learson succeeded Watson as CEO, then quickly retired upon reaching the mandatory retirement age of 60 in 1973. Following Learson in the CEO office was Frank T. Cary, a 25-year IBMer who had run the data processing division in the 1960s.

Datamation in 1971 stated that "the perpetual, ominous force called IBM rolls on". The company's dominance let it keep prices high and rarely update products, all built with only IBM components. During Cary's tenure as CEO, the IBM System/370 was introduced in 1970 as IBM's new mainframe. The S/370 did not prove as technologically revolutionary as its predecessor, the System/360. From a revenue perspective, it more than sustained the cash cow status of the 360.

A less successful effort to replicate the 360 mainframe revolution was the Future Systems project. Between 1971 and 1975, IBM investigated the feasibility of a new revolutionary line of products designed to make obsolete all existing products in order to re-establish its technical supremacy. This effort was terminated by IBM's top management in 1975. By then it had consumed most of the high-level technical planning and design resources, thus jeopardizing progress of the existing product lines (although some elements of FS were later incorporated into actual products).

Other IBM innovations during the early 1970s included the IBM 3340 disk unit – introduced in 1973 and known as "Winchester" after IBM's internal project name – was a storage technology which more than doubled the information density on disk surfaces. Winchester technology was adopted by the industry and used for the next two decades.

Some 1970s-era IBM technologies emerged to become facets of everyday life. IBM developed magnetic stripe technology in the 1960s, and it became a credit card industry standard in 1971. The IBM-invented floppy disk, also introduced in 1971, became the standard for storing personal computer data during the first decades of the PC era. IBM Research scientist Edgar 'Ted' Codd wrote a seminal paper describing the relational database, an invention that Forbes magazine described as one of the most important innovations of the 20th century. The IBM 5100, 50 lbs. and $9000 of personal mobility, was introduced in 1975 and presaged – at least in function if not size or price or units sold – the Personal Computer of the 1980s. IBM's 3660 supermarket checkout station, introduced in 1973, used holographic technology to scan product prices from UPC bar codes, which itself was based a 1952 IBM patent that became a grocery industry standard. Also in 1973, bank customers began making withdrawals, transfers and other account inquiries via the IBM 3614 Consumer Transaction Facility, an early form of today's Automatic Teller Machines.

IBM had an innovator's role in pervasive technologies that were less visible as well. In 1974, IBM announced Systems Network Architecture (SNA), a networking protocol for computing systems. SNA is a uniform set of rules and procedures for computer communications to free computer users from the technical complexities of communicating through local, national, and international computer networks. SNA became the most widely used system for data processing until more open architecture standards were approved in the 1990s. In 1975, IBM researcher Benoit Mandelbrot conceived fractal geometry – a new geometrical concept that made it possible to describe mathematically the kinds of irregularities existing in nature. Fractals had a great impact on engineering, economics, metallurgy, art and health sciences, and are integral to the field of computer graphics and animation.

A less successful business endeavor for IBM was its entry into the office copier market in the 1970s, after turning down the opportunity to purchase the xerography technology. The company was immediately sued by Xerox Corporation for patent infringement. Although Xerox held the patents for the use of selenium as a photoconductor, IBM researchers perfected the use of organic photoconductors which avoided the Xerox patents. The litigation lasted until the late 1970s and was ultimately settled. Despite this victory, IBM never gained traction in the copier market and withdrew from the marketplace in the 1980s. Organic photoconductors are now widely used in copiers.

Throughout this period, IBM was litigating the antitrust suit filed by the Justice Department in 1969. But in a related bit of case law, the landmark Honeywell v. Sperry Rand U.S. federal court case was concluded in April 1973. The 1964 patent for the ENIAC, the world's first general-purpose electronic digital computer, was found both invalid and unenforceable for a variety of reasons thus putting the invention of the electronic digital computer into the public domain. However, IBM was ruled to have created a monopoly via its 1956 patent-sharing agreement with Sperry-Rand.

American antitrust laws did not affect IBM in Europe, where as of 1971 it had fewer competitors and more than 50% market share in almost every country. Customers preferred IBM because it was, as Datamation said, "the only truly international computer company", able to serve clients almost anywhere. Rivals such as ICL, CII, and Siemens began to cooperate to preserve a European computer industry.

Key events

 1970: System/370. IBM announces System/370 as successor to System/360.
 1970: Relational databases. IBM introduces relational databases which call for information stored within a computer to be arranged in easy-to-interpret tables to access and manage large amounts of data. Today, most database structures are based on the IBM concept of relational databases.
 1970: Office copiers. IBM introduces its first of three models of xerographic copiers. These machines mark the first commercial use of organic photoconductors which since became the dominant technology.
 1971: Speech recognition. IBM achieves its first operational application of speech recognition, which enables engineers servicing equipment to talk to and receive spoken answers from a computer that can recognize about 5,000 words. Today, IBM's ViaVoice recognition technology has a vocabulary of 64,000 words and a 260,000-word back-up dictionary.
 1971: Floppy disk. IBM introduces the floppy disk. Convenient and portable, the floppy becomes a personal computer industry standard for storing data.
 1973: Winchester storage technology. The IBM 3340 disk unit – known as "Winchester" after IBM's internal project name – is introduced, more than doubling the information density on disk surfaces. It featured a smaller, lighter read/write head that rode on an air film only 18 millionths of an inch thick. Winchester technology was adopted by the industry and used for the next two decades.
 1973: Nobel Prize. Dr. Leo Esaki, an IBM Fellow who joined the company in 1960, shares the 1973 Nobel Prize in physics for his 1958 discovery of the phenomenon of electron tunneling. His discovery of the semiconductor junction called the Esaki diode finds wide use in electronics applications. More importantly, his work in the field of semiconductors lays a foundation for further exploration in the electronic transport of solids.
 1974: SNA. IBM announces Systems Network Architecture (SNA), a networking protocol for computing systems. SNA is a uniform set of rules and procedures for computer communications to free computer users from the technical complexities of communicating through local, national, and international computer networks. SNA becomes the most widely used system for data processing until more open architecture standards were approved in the 1990s.

1975–1992: Information revolution, rise of software and PC industries

President of IBM John R. Opel became CEO in 1981. IBM was one of the world's largest companies and had a 62% share of the mainframe computer market that year. While frequently relocated employees and families still joked that IBM stood for "I've Been Moved", and employees of acquisitions feared that formal IBM employees would change the culture of their more casual offices, IBM no longer required white shirts for male employees, who still wore conservative suits when meeting customers. Former employees such as Gene Amdahl used their training to found and lead many competitors and suppliers.

Expecting Japanese competition, IBM in the late 1970s began investing in manufacturing to lower costs, offering volume discounts and lower prices to large customers, and introducing new products more frequently. The company also sometimes used non-IBM components in products, and sometimes resold others' products as its own. In 1980 it introduced its first computer terminal compatible with non-IBM equipment, and Displaywriter was the first new product less expensive than the competition. IBM's share of the overall computer market, however, declined from 60% in 1970 to 32% in 1980. Perhaps distracted by the long-running antitrust lawsuit, the "Colossus of Armonk" missed the fast-growing minicomputer market during the 1970s, and was behind rivals such as Wang, Hewlett-Packard (HP), Digital Equipment Corporation, Tandem Computers, and Control Data in other areas.

In 1979 BusinessWeek asked, "Is IBM just another stodgy, mature company?" By 1981 its stock price had declined by 22%. IBM's earnings for the first half of the year grew by 5.3% – one third of the inflation rate – while those of minicomputer maker Digital Equipment Corporation (DEC) grew by more than 35%. Although IBM began selling minicomputers, in January 1982 the Justice Department ended the antitrust suit because, The New York Times reported, the government "recognized what computer experts and securities analysts had long since concluded: I.B.M. no longer dominates the computer business".

IBM wished to avoid the same outcome with the new personal computer industry. The company studied the market for years and, as with UNIVAC, others like Apple Computer entered it first; IBM did not want a product with a rival's logo on corporate customers' desks. The company opened its first retail store in November 1980, and a team in the Boca Raton, Florida office built the IBM PC using commercial off-the-shelf components. The new computer debuted on August 12, 1981 from the Entry Systems Division led by Don Estridge. IBM immediately became more of a presence in the consumer marketplace, thanks to the memorable Little Tramp advertising campaign. Though not a spectacular machine by technological standards of the day, the IBM PC brought together all of the most desirable features of a computer into one small machine. It had 128 kilobytes of memory (expandable to 256 kilobytes), one or two floppy disks and an optional color monitor. And it had the prestige of the IBM brand. Although not inexpensive, with a base price of US$1,565 it was affordable for businesses – and many businesses purchased PCs. Reassured by the IBM name, they began buying these microcomputers on their own budgets aimed at numerous applications that corporate computer departments did not, and in many cases could not, accommodate. Typically, these purchases were not by corporate computer departments, as the PC was not seen as a "proper" computer. Purchases were often instigated by middle managers and senior staff who saw the potential – once the revolutionary VisiCalc spreadsheet, the killer app, had been surpassed by a far more powerful and stable product, Lotus 1-2-3.

IBM's dominance of the mainframe market in Europe and the US encouraged existing customers to buy the PC, and vice versa; as sales of what had been an experiment in a new market became a substantial part of IBM's financials, the company found that customers also bought larger IBM computers. Unlike the BUNCH and other rivals IBM quickly adjusted to the retail market, with its own sales force competing with outside retailers for the first time. By 1985 IBM was the world's most profitable industrial company, and its sales of personal computers were larger than that of minicomputers despite having been in the latter market since the early 1970s.

By 1983 industry analyst Gideon Gartner warned that IBM "is creating a dangerous situation for competitors in the marketplace". The company helped others by defining technical standards and creating large new software markets, but the new aggressiveness that began in the late 1970s helped it dominate areas like computer leasing and computer-aided design. Free from the antitrust case, IBM was present in every computer market other than supercomputers, and entered communications by purchasing Rolm – the first acquisition in 18 years – and 18% of MCI. The company was so important to component suppliers that it urged them to diversify. When IBM (61% of revenue) abruptly reduced orders from Miniscribe shares of not only Miniscribe but that of uninvolved companies that sold to IBM fell, as investors feared their vulnerability. IBM was also vulnerable when suppliers could not fulfill orders; customers and dealers also feared becoming overdependent.

The IBM PC AT's 1984 debut startled the industry. Rivals admitted that they did not expect the low price of the sophisticated product. IBM's attack on every area of the computer industry and entry into communications caused competitors, analysts, and the press to speculate that it would again be sued for antitrust. Datamation and others said that the company's continued growth might hurt the United States, by suppressing startups with new technology. Gartner Group estimated in 1985 that of the 100 largest data-processing companies, IBM had 41% of all revenue and 69% of profit. Its computer revenue was about nine times that of second-place DEC, and larger than that of IBM's six largest Japanese competitors combined. The 22% profit margin was three times the 6.7% average for the other 99 companies. Competitors complained to Congress, ADAPSO discussed the company with the Justice Department, and European governments worried about IBM's influence but feared affecting its more than 100,000 employees there at 19 facilities.

However, the company soon lost its lead in both PC hardware and software, thanks in part to its unprecedented (for IBM) decision to contract PC components to outside companies like Microsoft and Intel. Up to this point in its history, IBM relied on a vertically integrated strategy, building most key components of its systems itself, including processors, operating systems, peripherals, databases and the like. In an attempt to accelerate the time-to-market for the PC, IBM chose not to build a proprietary operating system and microprocessor. Instead, it sourced these vital components from Microsoft and Intel respectively. Ironically, in a decade which marked the end of IBM's monopoly, it was this fateful decision by IBM that passed the sources of its monopolistic power (operating system and processor architecture) to Microsoft and Intel, paving the way for rise of PC compatibles and the creation of hundreds of billions of dollars of market value outside of IBM.

John Akers became IBM's CEO in 1985. During the 1980s, IBM's investment in building its research organization produced four Nobel Prize winners in physics, achieving breakthroughs in mathematics, memory storage and telecommunications, and expanded computing capabilities. In 1980, IBM researcher John Cocke introduced Reduced Instruction Set Computing (RISC). Cocke received both the National Medal of Technology and the National Medal of Science for his innovation, but IBM itself failed to recognize the importance of RISC, and lost the lead in RISC technology to Sun Microsystems.

In 1984 the company partnered with Sears to develop a pioneering online home banking and shopping service for home PCs that launched in 1988 as Prodigy. Despite a strong reputation and anticipating many of the features, functions, and technology that characterize the online experience of today, the venture was plagued by overly conservative management decisions, and was eventually sold in the mid-1990s.

The IBM token-ring local area network, introduced in 1985, permitted personal computer users to exchange information and share printers and files within a building or complex. In 1988, IBM partnered with the University of Michigan and MCI Communications to create the National Science Foundation Network (NSFNet), an important step in the creation of the Internet. But within five years the company backed away from this early lead in Internet protocols and router technologies in order to support its existing SNA revenue stream, thereby missing a boom market of the 1990s. Still, IBM investments and advances in microprocessors, disk drives, network technologies, software applications, and online commerce in the 1980s set the stage for the emergence of the connected world in the 1990s.

However, by the end of the decade, IBM was in trouble. It was a bloated organization of some 400,000 employees that was heavily invested in too any low margin, transactional, commodity businesses. Technologies IBM invented and or commercialized – DRAM, hard disk drives, the PC, electric typewriters – were starting to erode. The company had a massive international organization characterized by redundant processes and functions – its cost structure couldn't compete with smaller, less diversified competitors. Additionally, the back-to-back revolutions – the PC and the client-server – combined to undermine IBM's core mainframe business. The PC revolution placed computers directly in the hands of millions of people. It was followed by the client/server revolution, which sought to link PCs (the "clients") with larger computers that labored in the background (the "servers" that served data and applications to client machines). Both revolutions transformed the way customers viewed, used and bought technology. And both fundamentally rocked IBM and its mainframe competitors. Businesses' purchasing decisions were put in the hands of individuals and departments – not the places where IBM had long-standing customer relationships. Piece-part technologies took precedence over integrated solutions. The focus was on the desktop and personal productivity, not on business applications across the enterprise. As a result, earnings – which had been at or above US$5 billion since the early 1980s, dropped by more than a third to US$3 billion in 1989. A brief spike in earnings in 1990 did not last as corporate spending continued to shift from high-profit margin mainframes to lower margin microprocessor-based systems. In addition, corporate downsizing was in full swing.

Radical changes were considered and implemented. As IBM assessed the situation, it was clear that competition and innovation in the computer industry were now taking place along segmented, versus vertically integrated lines, where computer industry leaders emerged in their respective domains. Examples included Intel in microprocessors, Microsoft in desktop software, Novell in networking, HP in printers, Seagate in disk drives and Oracle Corporation in database software. IBM's dominance in personal computers was challenged by the likes of Compaq and later Dell. Recognizing this trend, management, with the support of the Board of Directors, began to implement a plan to split IBM into increasingly autonomous business units (e.g. processors, storage, software, services, printers, etc.) to compete more effectively with competitors that were more focused and nimble and had lower cost structures.

IBM also began shedding businesses that it felt were no longer core. It sold its typewriter, keyboard, and printer business – the organization that created the popular "Selectric" typewriter with its floating "golf ball" type element in the 1960s – to the investment firm of Clayton, Dubilier & Rice Inc. and became an independent company, Lexmark Inc.

These efforts failed to halt the slide. A decade of steady acceptance and widening corporate growth of local area networking technology, a trend headed by Novell Inc. and other vendors, and its logical counterpart, the ensuing decline of mainframe sales, brought about a wake-up call for IBM. After two consecutive years of reporting losses in excess of $1 billion, on January 19, 1993, IBM announced a US$8.10 billion loss for the 1992 financial year, which was then the largest single-year corporate loss in U.S. history. All told, between 1991 and 1993, the company posted net losses of nearly $16 billion. IBM's three-decade-long Golden Age, triggered by Watson Jr. in the 1950s, was over. The computer industry now viewed IBM as no longer relevant, an organizational dinosaur. And hundreds of thousands of IBMers lost their jobs, including CEO John Akers.

Key events

 mid-1970s: IBM VNET. VNET was an international computer networking system deployed in the mid-1970s, providing email and file-transfer for IBM. By September 1979, the network had grown to include 285 mainframe nodes in Europe, Asia, and North America.
 1975: Fractals. IBM researcher Benoit Mandelbrot conceives fractal geometry – the concept that seemingly irregular shapes can have identical structure at all scales. This new geometry makes it possible to describe mathematically the kinds of irregularities existing in nature. Fractals later make a great impact on engineering, economics, metallurgy, art, and health sciences, and are also applied in the field of computer graphics and animation.
 1975: IBM 5100 Portable computer. IBM introduces the 5100 Portable Computer, a 50 lb. desktop machine that put computer capabilities at the fingertips of engineers, analysts, statisticians, and other problem-solvers. More "luggable" than portable, the 5100 can serve as a terminal for the System/370 and costs from $9000 to $20,000.
 1976: Space Shuttle. The Enterprise, the first vehicle in the U.S. Space Shuttle program, makes its debut at Palmdale, California, carrying IBM AP-101 flight computers and special hardware built by IBM.
 1976: Laser printer. The first IBM 3800 printer is installed. The 3800 is the first commercial printer to combine laser technology and electrophotography. The technology speeds the printing of bank statements, premium notices, and other high-volume documents, and remains a workhorse for billing and accounts receivable departments.
 1977: Data Encryption Standard. IBM-developed Data Encryption Standard (DES), a cryptographic algorithm, is adopted by the U.S. National Bureau of Standards as a national standard.
 1979: Retail checkout. IBM develops the Universal Product Code (UPC) in the 1970s as a method for embedding pricing and identification information on individual retail items. In 1979, IBM applies holographic scanner technology in IBM's supermarket checkout station to read the UPC stripes on merchandise, one of the first major commercial uses of holography. IBM's support of the UPC concept helps lead to its widespread acceptance by retail and other industries worldwide.
 1979: Thin film recording heads. Instead of using hand-wound wire structures as coils for inductive elements, IBM researchers substitute thin film "wires" patterned by optical lithography. This leads to higher performance recording heads at a reduced cost and establishes IBM's leadership in "areal density": storing the most data in the least space. The result is higher-capacity and higher-performance disk drives.
 1979: Overcoming barriers to technology use. Since 1946, with its announcement of Chinese and Arabic ideographic character typewriters, IBM has worked to overcome cultural and physical barriers to the use of technology. As part of these ongoing efforts, IBM introduces the 3270 Kanji Display Terminal; the System/34 Kanji System with an ideographic feature, which processes more than 11,000 Japanese and Chinese characters; and the Audio Typing Unit for sight-impaired typists.
 1979: First multi-function copier/printer. A communication-enabled laser printer and photocopier combination was introduced, the IBM 6670 Information Distributor. This was the first multi-function (copier/printer) device for the office market.
 1980: Thermal conduction modules. IBM introduces the 3081 processor, the company's most powerful to date, which features Thermal Conduction Modules. In 1990, the Institute of Electrical and Electronics Engineers, Inc., awards its 1990 Corporate Innovation Recognition to IBM for the development of the Multilayer Ceramic Thermal Conduction Module for high performance computers.
 1980: Reduced instruction set computing (RISC) architecture. IBM successfully builds the first prototype computer employing IBM Fellow John Cocke's RISC architecture. RISC simplified the instructions given to computers, making them faster and more powerful. Today, RISC architecture is the basis of most workstations and widely viewed as the dominant computing architecture.
 1981: IBM PC. The IBM Personal Computer goes mass market and helps revolutionize the way the world does business. A year later, Time Magazine gives its "Person of the Year" award to the Personal Computer.
 1981: LASIK surgery. Three IBM scientists invent the excimer laser surgical procedure that later forms the basis of LASIK and PRK corrective eye surgeries.
 1982: Antitrust suit. The United States antitrust suit against IBM, filed in 1969, is dismissed as being "without merit."
 1982: Trellis-coded modulation. Trellis-coded modulation (TCM) is first used in voice-band modems to send data at higher rates over telephone channels. Today, TCM is applied in a large variety of terrestrial and satellite-based transmission systems as a key technique for achieving faster and more reliable digital transmission.
 1983: IBM PCjr. IBM announces the widely anticipated PCjr., an attempt to enter the home computing marketplace. The product, however, fails to capture the fancy of consumers due to its lack of compatibility with IBM PC software, its price point, and its unfortunate 'chiclet' keyboard design. IBM terminates the product after 18 months of disappointing sales.
 1984: IBM 3480 magnetic tape system. The industry's most advanced magnetic tape system, the IBM 3480, introduces a new generation of tape drives that replace the familiar reel of tape with an easy-to-handle cartridge. The 3480 was the industry's first tape system to use "thin-film" recording head technology.
 1984: Sexual discrimination. IBM adds sexual orientation to the company's non-discrimination policy. IBM becomes one of the first major companies to make this change.
 1984: ROLM partnership/acquisition. IBM acquires ROLM Corporation for $1.25 billion. Based in Santa Clara, CA (subsequent to an existing partnership), IBM intended to develop digital telephone switches to compete directly with Northern Telecom and AT&T. Two of the most popular systems were the large scale PABX coined ROLM CBX and the smaller PABX coined ROLM Redwood. ROLM is later acquired by Siemens AG in 1989–1992.
 1985: MCI. IBM acquires 18% of MCI Communications, the United States's second-largest long-distance carrier, in June 1985.
 1985: RP3. Sparked in part by national concerns over losing its technology leadership in the early 1980s, IBM re-enters the supercomputing field with the RP3 (IBM Research Parallel Processor Prototype). IBM researchers worked with scientists from the New York University's Courant Institute of Mathematical Science to design RP3, an experimental computer consisting of up to 512 processors, linked in parallel and connected to as many as two billion characters of main memory. Over the next five years, IBM provides more than $30 million in products and support to a supercomputer facility established at Cornell University in Ithaca, New York.
 1985: Token Ring Network. IBM's Token Ring technology brings a new level of control to local area networks and quickly becomes an industry standard for networks that connect printers, workstations and servers.
 1986: IBM Almaden Research Center. IBM Research dedicates the Almaden Research Center in California. Today, Almaden is IBM's second-largest laboratory focused on storage systems, technology and computer science.
 1986: Nobel Prize: Scanning tunneling microscopy. IBM Fellows Gerd K. Binnig and Heinrich Rohrer of the IBM Zurich Research Laboratory win the 1986 Nobel Prize in physics for their work in scanning tunneling microscopy. Drs. Binnig and Rohrer are recognized for developing a powerful microscopy technique which makes images of surfaces where individual atoms may be seen.
 1987: Nobel Prize: High-Temperature Superconductivity. J. Georg Bednorz and IBM Fellow Alex Müller of the IBM Zurich Research Laboratory receive the 1987 Nobel Prize for physics for their breakthrough discovery of high-temperature superconductivity in a new class of materials. They discover superconductivity in ceramic oxides that carry electricity without loss of energy at higher temperatures than any other superconductor.
 1987: Antivirus tools. As personal computers become vulnerable to attack from viruses, a small research group at IBM develops a suite of antivirus tools. The effort leads to the establishment of the High Integrity Computing Laboratory (HICL) at IBM. HICL goes on to pioneer the science of theoretical and observational computer virus epidemiology.
 1987: Special needs access. IBM Researchers demonstrate the feasibility for blind computer users to read information directly from computer screens with the aid of an experimental mouse. And in 1988 the IBM Personal System/2 Screen Reader is announced, permitting blind or visually impaired people to hear the text as it is displayed on the screen in the same way a sighted person would see it. This is the first in the IBM Independence Series of products for computer users with special needs.
 1988: IBM AS/400. IBM introduces the IBM Application System/400, a new family of easy-to-use computers designed for small and intermediate-sized companies. As part of the introduction, IBM and IBM Business Partners worldwide announce the availability of more than 1,000 software packages resulting in the AS/400 becoming a popular business computing system.
 1988: National Science Foundation Network (NSFNET). IBM collaborates with the Merit Network, MCI Communications, the State of Michigan, and the National Science Foundation to upgrade and expand the 56K bit per second NSFNET to 1.5M bps (T1) and later 45M bps (T3). This partnership provides the network infrastructure and lays the groundwork for the explosive growth of the Internet in the 1990s. The NSFNET upgrade boosts network capacity and speed allowing more intensive forms of data, such as the graphics, to travel across the Internet.
 1989: Silicon germanium transistors. The replacing of expensive and exotic materials like gallium arsenide with silicon germanium (known as SiGe), championed by IBM Fellow Bernie Meyerson, creates faster chips at lower costs. Introducing germanium into the base layer of an otherwise all-silicon bipolar transistor allows for improvements in operating frequency, current, noise and power capabilities.
 1990: System/390. IBM introduces the System/390 family. IBM incorporates complementary metal oxide silicon (CMOS) based processors into System/390 Parallel Enterprise Server in 1995. In 1998 the System/390 G5 Parallel Enterprise Server 10-way Turbo model exceeded the 1,000 MIPS barrier.
 1990: RISC System/6000. IBM announces the RISC System/6000, a family of nine workstations that are among the fastest and most powerful in the industry. The RISC System/6000 uses Reduced instruction set computing technology, an computer design pioneered by IBM that simplifies processing steps to speed the execution of commands.
 1990: Moving individual atoms. Donald M. Eigler, a physicist and IBM Fellow at the IBM Almaden Research Center demonstrated the ability to manipulate individual atoms using a scanning tunneling microscope, writing I-B-M using 35 individual xenon atoms.
 1990: Environmental programs. IBM joins 14 U.S. corporations to establish a worldwide program to achieve environmental, health and safety goals by continuously improving environmental management practices and performance. IBM has invested more than $1 billion since 1973 to provide environmental protection for the communities in which IBM facilities are located.
 1991: Services business. IBM reenters the computer services business through the formation of the Integrated Systems Solution Corporation. Despite being in compliance with the provisions of the 1956 Consent Decree, in four years ISSC becomes the second largest provider of computer services. The new business becomes one of IBM's primary revenue streams.
 1992: Thinkpad. IBM introduces a new line of notebook computers. Housed in a black case and featuring the TrackPoint device in the middle of the keyboard, the Thinkpad collects more than 300 awards for design and quality.

1993–2018: IBM's near disaster and rebirth

In April 1993, IBM hired  Louis V. Gerstner Jr. as its new CEO. For the first time since 1914 IBM had recruited a leader from outside its ranks. Gerstner had been chairman and CEO of RJR Nabisco for four years, and had previously spent 11 years as a top executive at American Express. Gerstner brought with him a customer-oriented sensibility and the strategic-thinking expertise that he had honed through years as a management consultant at McKinsey & Co. Recognizing that his first priority was to stabilize the company, he adopted a triage mindset and took quick action. His early decisions included recommitting to the mainframe, selling the Federal Systems Division to Loral in order to replenish the company's cash coffers, continuing to shrink the workforce (reaching a low of 220,000 employees in 1994), and driving significant cost reductions within the company. Most importantly, Gerstner decided to reverse the move to spin off IBM business units into separate companies. He recognized that one of IBM's strengths was its ability to provide integrated solutions for customers – more than piece parts or components. Splitting the company would have destroyed that IBM advantage.

These initial steps worked. In 1994 IBM turned a profit of $3 billion. Stabilization was not Gerstner's endgame – the restoration of IBM's once great reputation was. To do that, he needed a winning business strategy. Over the next decade, Gerstner shed commodity businesses and focused on high-margin opportunities. IBM divested itself of low margin industries (DRAM, IBM Network, personal printers, and hard drives).

By building upon the decision to keep the company whole, IBM built a global services business and a reputation as a technology integrator. IBM claimed that the services business became brand agnostic integrating whatever technologies the client required, even if they were from an IBM competitor. IBM augmented this services business with the 2002 acquisition of the consultancy division of PricewaterhouseCoopers for $3.5 billion US.

Another high margin opportunity IBM invested in was software. Starting in 1995 with its acquisition of Lotus Development Corp., IBM built its software portfolio from one brand, IBM DB2, to five: DB2, Lotus, WebSphere, Tivoli, and Rational. Content to leave the consumer applications business to other firms, IBM's software strategy focused on middleware – the vital software that connects operating systems to applications. The middleware business played to IBM's strengths, and its higher margins improved the company's bottom line significantly as the century came to an end.

Not all software that IBM developed was successful. While the operating system OS/2 was arguably technically superior to Microsoft Windows 95, OS/2 sales were largely concentrated in networked computing used by corporate professionals. OS/2 failed to develop much penetration in the consumer and stand-alone desktop PC segments. There were reports that it could not be installed properly on IBM's own Aptiva series of home PCs.

Microsoft made an offer in 1994 where if IBM ended development of OS/2 completely, then it would receive the same terms as Compaq for a license of Windows 95. IBM refused and instead went with an "IBM First" strategy of promoting OS/2 Warp and disparaging Windows, as IBM aimed to drive sales of its own software and hardware. By 1995, Windows 95 negotiations between IBM and Microsoft, which were difficult, stalled when IBM purchased Lotus Development whose Lotus SmartSuite would have directly competed with Microsoft Office. As a result, IBM received their license later than their competitors which hurt sales of IBM PCs. IBM officials later conceded that OS/2 would not have been a viable operating system to keep them in the PC business.

While IBM hardware and technologies were relatively de-emphasized in Gerstner's three-legged business model, they were not relegated to secondary status. The company brought its research organization to bear more closely on its existing product lines and development processes. While Internet applications and deep computing overtook client servers as key business technology priorities, mainframes returned to relevance. IBM reinvigorated their mainframe line with CMOS technologies, which made them among the most powerful and cost-efficient in the marketplace. Investments in microelectronics research and manufacturing made IBM a world leader in specialized, high margin chip production – it developed 200 mm wafer processes in 1992, and 300 mm wafers within the decade. IBM-designed chips were used in PlayStation 3, Xbox 360, and Wii game consoles. IBM also regained the lead in supercomputing with high-end machines based upon scalable parallel processor technology.

Equally significant in IBM's revival was its reentry into the popular mindset. On October 5, 1992, at the COMDEX computer expo, IBM announced the first ThinkPad laptop computer, the 700C. The ThinkPad, a premium machine which then cost US$4350, included a 25 MHz Intel 80486SL processor, a 10.4-inch active matrix display, removable 120 MB hard drive, 4 MB RAM (expandable to 16 MB) and a TrackPoint II pointing device. The design by noted designer Richard Sapper made the Thinkpad successful with the digerati, and the cool factor of the ThinkPad brought back some of the cachet to the IBM brand that was lost in the PC wars of the 1980s. Instrumental to this popular resurgence was the 1997 chess match between IBM's chess-playing computer system Deep Blue and reigning world chess champion Garry Kasparov. Deep Blue's victory was a historic first for a computer over a reigning world champion. Also helping the company reclaim its position as a technology leader was its annual domination of supercomputer rankings and patent leadership statistics. Ironically,  a contributor in reviving the company's reputation was the Dot-com bubble collapse in 2000, where many of the edgy technology high flyers of the 1990s failed to survive the downturn. These collapses discredited some of the more fashionable Internet-driven business models that IBM was previously compared against.

Another factor was the company's revival of the IBM brand. The company's marketing during the economic downturn was chaotic, presenting different, sometimes discordant voices in the marketplace. This brand chaos was attributable in part to the company having 70 different advertising agencies in its employ. In 1994, IBM consolidated its advertising in one agency. The result was a coherent, consistent message to the marketplace.

As IBM recovered its financial footing, it sought to redefine the Internet age in ways that played to traditional IBM strengths, couching the discussion in business-centric manners with initiatives like e-commerce and On Demand. It supported open source initiatives, forming ventures with partners and competitors alike.

The company also revamped its philanthropic practices to bring focus on improving K-12 education. It ended its 40-year technology partnership with the International Olympic Committee after a successful engagement at the 2000 Olympic Games in Sydney, Australia. On the human resources front, IBM adopted and integrated diversity principles and practices ahead of the industry. It added sexual orientation to its non-discrimination practices in 1984, in 1995 created executive diversity task forces, and in 1996 offered domestic partner benefits to its employees. The company is listed as among the best places for employees, employees of color, and women to work. And in 1996, the Women in Technology International Hall of Fame inducted three IBM employees as part of its inaugural class of 10 women: Ruth Leach Amonette, the first woman to hold an executive position at IBM; Barbara Grant, PhD, first woman to be named an IBM site general manager; and Linda Sanford, the highest-placed technical woman in IBM. Fran Allen – a software pioneer for her innovative work in compilers over the decades – was inducted in 1997.

Gerstner retired at the end of 2002, and was replaced by long-time IBMer Samuel J. Palmisano.

Key events

 1993: Billion-dollar losses. IBM misreads two significant trends in the computer industry: personal computers and client-server computing: and as a result loses more than $8 billion in 1993, its third straight year of billion-dollar losses. Since 1991, the company lost $16 billion, and many feel IBM is no longer a viable player in the industry.
 1993: Louis V. Gerstner Jr.. Gerstner arrives as IBM's chairman and CEO on April 1, 1993. For the first time since the arrival of Thomas J. Watson Sr., in 1914, IBM has a leader pulled from outside its ranks. Gerstner had been chairman and CEO of RJR Nabisco for four years and had previously spent 11 years as a top executive at American Express.
 1993: IBM Scalable POWERparallel system. IBM introduces the Scalable POWERparallel System, the first in a family of microprocessor-based supercomputers using RISC System/6000 technology. IBM pioneers scalable parallel system technology of joining smaller, mass-produced computer processors rather than relying on one larger, custom-designed processor. Complex queries could then be broken down into a series of smaller jobs that are run concurrently ("in parallel") to speed their completion.
 1994: Turnaround. IBM reports a profit for the year, its first since 1990. Over the next few years, the company focuses less on its traditional strengths in hardware, and more on services, software, and its ability to craft technology solutions.
 1994: IBM RAMAC Array Storage Family. With features like highly parallel processing, multi-level cache, RAID 5, and redundant components, RAMAC advances information storage technology. Consisting of the RAMAC Array Direct Access Storage Device (DASD) and the RAMAC Array Subsystem, almost 2,000 systems shipped to customers in its first three months of availability.
 1994: Speech recognition. IBM releases the IBM Personal Dictation System (IPDS), the first wave of speech recognition products for the personal computer. It is later renamed VoiceType, and its capabilities are expanded to include control of computer applications and desktops simply by talking to them, without touching a keyboard. In 1997 IBM announces ViaVoice Gold, software that provides a hands-free way to dictate text and navigate the desktop using natural, continuous speech.
 1995: Lotus Development Corporation acquisition. IBM acquires the outstanding shares of the Lotus Development Corporation, whose Notes software improves collaboration across an enterprise and whose acquisition makes IBM the world's largest software company.
 1995: Glueball calculation. IBM scientists complete a two-year calculation – the largest single numerical calculation in the history of computing – to pin down the properties of an elusive elementary particle called a "glueball." The calculation was carried out on GF11, a massively parallel computer at the IBM Thomas J. Watson Research Center.
 1996: IBM Austin Research Laboratory opens. Based in Austin, Texas, the lab is focused on advanced circuit design as well as new design techniques and tools for very high performance microprocessors.
 1996: Atlanta Olympics. IBM suffers a highly public embarrassment when its IT support of the Olympic Games in Atlanta experiences technical difficulties.
 1996: Domestic partner benefits. IBM announces Domestic Partner Benefits for gay and lesbian employees.
 1997: Deep Blue. The 32-node IBM RS/6000 SP supercomputer, Deep Blue, defeats World Chess Champion Garry Kasparov in the first known instance of a computer beating a reigning world champion chess player in a tournament-style competition.
 1997: eBusiness. IBM coins the term and defined an enormous new industry by using the Internet as a medium for real business and institutional transformation. e-business becomes synonymous with doing business in the Internet age.
 1998: CMOS Gigaprocessor. IBM unveils the first microprocessor that runs at 1 billion cycles per second. IBM scientists develop new Silicon on insulator chips to be used in the construction of a mainstream processor. The breakthrough ushers in new circuit designs and product groups.
 1999: Blue Gene. IBM Research starts a computer architecture cooperative project with the Lawrence Livermore National Laboratory, the United States Department of Energy (which is partially funding the project), and academia to build new supercomputers (4) capable of more than one quadrillion operations per second (one petaflop). Nicknamed "Blue Gene," the new supercomputers perform 500 times faster than other powerful supercomputers and can simulate folding complex proteins.
 2000: Quantum mirage nanotechnology. IBM scientists discover a way to transport information on the atomic scale using electrons instead of conventional wiring. This new phenomenon, called the Quantum mirage effect, may enable data transfer within future nanoscale electronic circuits too small to use wires. The quantum mirage technique can send information through solid forms and could do away with wiring that connects nanocircuit components.
 2000: IBM ASCI White – Fastest supercomputer. IBM delivers the world's most powerful computer to the US Department of Energy, powerful enough to process an Internet transaction for every person on Earth in less than a minute. IBM built the supercomputer to test the safety and effectiveness of the nation's aging nuclear weapons stockpile. This computer is 1,000 times more powerful than Deep Blue, the supercomputer that beat Garry Kasparov in chess in 1997.
 2000: Flexible transistors. IBM creates flexible transistors, combining organic and inorganic materials as a medium for semiconductors. By eliminating the limitations of etching computer circuits in silicon, flexible transistors make it possible to create a new generation of inexpensive computer displays that can be embedded into curved plastic or other materials.
 2000: Sydney Olympics. After a its successful engagement at the 2000 Olympic games in Sydney, IBM ends its 40-year technology partnership with the International Olympic Committee.
 2001: Holocaust controversy. A controversial book, IBM and the Holocaust: The Strategic Alliance Between Nazi Germany and America's Most Powerful Corporation by Edwin Black, accuses IBM of having knowingly assisted Nazi authorities in the perpetuation of the Holocaust through the provision of tabulating products and services. Several lawsuits are filed against IBM by Holocaust victims seeking restitution for their suffering and losses. All lawsuits related to this issue were eventually dropped without recovery.
 2001: Carbon nanotube transistors. IBM researchers build the world's first transistors out of carbon nanotubes – tiny cylinders of carbon atoms that are 500 times smaller than silicon-based transistors and 1,000 times stronger than steel. The breakthrough is thought to be an important step in finding materials that can be used to build computer chips when silicon-based chips can't be made smaller.
 2001: Low power initiative. IBM launches its low-power initiative to improve the energy efficiency of IT and accelerates the development of ultra-low power components and power-efficient servers, storage systems, personal computers and ThinkPad notebook computers.
 2001: Greater density & chip speeds. IBM is first to mass-produce computer hard disk drives using a revolutionary new type of magnetic coating – "pixie dust" – that eventually quadruples data density of current hard disk drive products.  IBM also unveils "strained silicon," a breakthrough that alters silicon to boost chip speeds by up to 35 percent.
 2002: The Hard disk drive business is sold to Hitachi.
 2003: Blue Gene/L. The BLUE GENE team unveils a proto-type of its Blue Gene/L computer roughly the size of a standard dishwasher that ranks as the 73rd most powerful supercomputer in the world. This cubic meter machine is a small scale model of the full Blue Gene/L built for the Lawrence Livermore National Laboratory in California, which will be 128 times larger when it's unveiled two years later.
 2005: Crusade Against Cancer. IBM joins forces with Memorial Sloan-Kettering Cancer Center (MSKCC), the Molecular Profiling Institute and the CHU Sainte-Justine Research Center to collaborate on cancer research by building state-of-the-art integrated information management systems.
 2005: The PC division is sold. The low-margin PC division (including Thinkpads) is sold to Chinese manufacturer, Lenovo.
 2006: Translation software. IBM delivers an advanced speech-to-speech translation system to U.S. forces in Iraq using bidirectional English to Arabic translation software that improves communication between military personnel and Iraqi forces and citizens. The software helps offset the shortage of military linguists.
 2007: Renewable energy. IBM is recognized by the US EPA for its green power purchases in the US and for its support and participation in EPA's Fortune 500 Green Power Challenge. IBM ranked 12th on the EPA's list of Green Power Partners for 2007.  IBM purchased enough renewable energy in 2007 to meet 4% of its US electricity use and 9% of its global electricity purchases. IBM's commitment to green power helps cut greenhouse gas emissions.
 2007: River watch using IBM Stream Computing. In a unique collaboration, The Beacon Institute and IBM created the first technology-based river monitoring network. The River and Estuary Observatory Network (REON) allows for minute-to-minute monitoring of New York's Hudson River via an integrated network of sensors, robotics and computational technology. This project is made possible by IBM's "Stream Computing," a new computer architecture that can examine thousands of information sources to help scientists better understand what is happening as it happens.
 2007: Patent power. IBM has been granted more US patents than any other company. From 1993 to 2007, IBM was awarded over 38,000 US patents and has invested about $5 billion annually in research, development, and engineering since 1996. IBM's active portfolio is about 26,000 patents in the US and over 40,000 patents worldwide is a direct result of that investment.
 2008: IBM Roadrunner No.1 Supercomputer. For the ninth consecutive time, IBM takes the No.1 ranking of the world's most powerful supercomputers with its computer built for the Roadrunner project at Los Alamos National Laboratory. It is the first in the world to operate at speeds faster than one quadrillion calculations per second and remains the world speed champion for over a year. The Los Alamos system is twice as energy-efficient as the No. 2 computer at the time, using about half the electricity to maintain the same level of computing power.
 2008: Green power. IBM opens its "greenest" data center in Boulder, Colorado. The energy-efficient facility is part of a $350 million investment by IBM to help meet customer demand for reducing energy costs. The new data center includes high-density computing systems with virtualization technology that reduce data center carbon footprint.
 2011: Watson. IBM's supercomputer Watson won on the TV game show Jeopardy! against Ken Jennings and Brad Rutter. The competition was presented by PBS.
 June 16, 2011: IBM founded 100 years ago. Mark Krantz and Jon Swartz in USA Today state It has remained at the forefront through the decades...the fifth-most-valuable U.S. company [today]...demonstrated a strength shared by most 100-year-old companies: the ability to change. ...survived not only the Depression and several recessions, but technological shifts and intense competition as well.
 April 2015:  IBM Watson Health division created. IBM Watson Health was created largely through a series of acquisitions with the intention of using Watson in healthcare.  A 2021 post from the Association for Computing Machinery (ACM) titled "What Happened To Watson Health?" described the portfolio management challenges. 
 October 28, 2018 Red Hat acquisition for $34 billion On October 28, 2018, IBM announced its intent to acquire Red Hat for US$34 billion, in one of its largest-ever acquisitions. The company will operate out of IBM's Hybrid Cloud division.

2019–present 
The 2019 acquisition of Red Hat enabled IBM to change its focus on future platforms, according to IBM Chief Executive Arvind Krishna.

In October 2020, IBM announced it is splitting itself into two public companies. IBM will focus on high-margin cloud computing and artificial intelligence, built on the foundation of the 2019 Red Hat acquisition. The legacy Managed Infrastructure Services unit will be spun off into a new public company Kyndryl to manage clients' IT infrastructure and accounts, and have 4,600 clients in 115 countries, with a backlog of $60 billion.

On January 21, 2022, IBM announced that it would sell Watson Health to the private equity firm Francisco Partners.

This new focus on hybrid cloud, separating IBM from its other business units, will be larger than any of its previous divestitures, and welcomed by investors.

In July 2022, IBM announced the acquisition of Databand, a data observability software developer, for an undisclosed amount. Following the acquisition, Databand employees will join IBM's data and AI division.

In December 2022, it was announced IBM had acquired the Reston-headquartered digital transformation and IT modernization services provider, Octo Consulting from Arlington Capital Partners for an undisclosed price. IBM also signed a partnership with new Japanese 2 nm process manufacturing company Rapidus.

Twentieth-century market power and antitrust
IBM dominated the electronic data processing market for most of the 20th century, initially controlling over 70 percent of the punch card and tabulating machine market and then achieving a similar share in the computer market. IBM asserted that its successes in achieving and maintaining such market share were due to its skill, industry and foresight; governments and competitors asserted that the maintenance of such large shares was at least in part due to anti-competitive acts such as unfair prices, terms and conditions, tying, product manipulations and creating FUD (Fear, Uncertainty and Doubt) related to its competitors,in the marketplace. IBM was thus the defendant in more than twenty government and private antitrust actions during the 20th century. IBM lost only one of these matters but did settle others in ways that profoundly shaped the industry as summarized below. By the end of the 20th century, IBM was no longer so dominant in the computer industry.  Some observers suggest management's attention to the many antitrust lawsuits of the 1970s was at least in part responsible for its decline.

1936 Consent Decree
In 1932 U.S. Government prosecutors asserted as anti-competition tying IBM's practice of requiring customers who leased its tabulating equipment to purchase punched cards used on such equipment. IBM lost the lawsuit and in the resulting 1936 consent decree, IBM agreed to no longer require only IBM cards and agreed to assist alternative suppliers of cards in starting production facilities that would compete with IBM's; thereby create a separate market for the punched cards and in effect for subsequent computer supplies such as magnetic tapes and disk packs.

1956 Consent Decree
On January 21, 1952 the U.S. Government filed a lawsuit which resulted in a consent decree entered as a final judgment on January 25, 1956. The government's goal to increase competition in the data processing industry was effected through several provisions in the decree: 
IBM was required to sell equipment on terms that would not place purchasers at a disadvantage with respect to customers leasing the same equipment from IBM. Prior to this decree, IBM had only rented its equipment. This created markets both for used IBM equipment and enabled lease financing of IBM equipment by third parties (leasing companies).
IBM was required to provide parts and information to independent maintainers of purchased IBM equipment, enabling and creating a demand for such hardware maintenance services.
IBM was required to sell data processing services through a subsidiary that could be treated no differently than any company independent of IBM, enabling competition in the data processing services business.  
IBM was required to grant non-exclusive, non-transferable, worldwide licenses for any and all patents at reasonable royalty rates to anyone, provided the licensee cross-licensed its patents to IBM on similar terms. This removed IBM patents as a barrier to competition in the data processing industry and enabled the emergence of manufacturers of equipment plug compatible to IBM equipment.

While the decree did little to limit IBM's future dominance of the then-nascent computer industry, it did enable competition in segments such as leasing, services, maintenance, and equipment attachable to IBM systems and reduced barriers to entry through mandatory reasonable patent cross-licensing.

The decree's terms remained in effect until 1996; they were phased out over the next five years.

1968–1984 Multiple Government and Private Antitrust Complaints
In 1968 the first of a series of antitrust suits against IBM was filed by Control Data Corp (CDC). It was followed in 1969 by the US government's antitrust complaint, then by 19 private US antitrust complaints and one European complaint. In the end IBM settled a few of these matters but mainly won. The US government's case sustained by four US Presidents and their Attorneys General was dropped as "without merit" in 1982 by William Baxter, US President Reagans' Assistant Attorney General in charge of the Antitrust Division of the U.S. Department of Justice.

1968–1973 Control Data Corp. v. IBM
CDC filed an antitrust lawsuit against IBM in Minnesota's federal court alleging that IBM had monopolized the market for computers in violation of section 2 of the Sherman Antitrust Act by among other things announcing products it could not deliver. A 1965 internal IBM memo by an IBM attorney noted that Control Data had publicly blamed its declining earnings on IBM, "and its frequent model and price changes. There was some sentiment that the charges were true." In 1973 IBM settled the CDC case for about $80 million in cash and the transfer of assets including the IBM Service Bureau Corporation to CDC.

1969–1982 U.S. v. IBM
On January 17, 1969, the United States of America filed a complaint in the United States District Court for the Southern District of New York, alleging that IBM violated Section 2 of the Sherman Antitrust Act by monopolizing or attempting to monopolize the general-purpose electronic digital computer system market, specifically computers designed primarily for business. Subsequently, the US government alleged IBM violated the antitrust laws in IBM's actions directed against leasing companies and plug-compatible peripheral manufacturers.

In June 1969 IBM unbundled its software and services in what many observers believed was in anticipation of and a direct result of the 1969 US Antitrust lawsuit. Overnight a competitive software market was created.

Among the major violations asserted were:
Anticompetitive price discrimination such as giving away software services.
Bundling of software with "related computer hardware equipment" for a single price.
Predatorily priced and preannounced specific hardware "fighting machines".
Developed and announced specific hardware products primarily for the purpose of discouraging customers from acquiring competing products.
Announced certain future products knowing that it was unlikely to be able to ship such products within the announced time frame.
Engaged in below cost and discount conduct in selected markets in order to injure peripheral manufacturers and leasing companies.

It was in some ways one of the great single firm monopoly cases of all times. IBM produced 30 million pages of materials during discovery; it submitted its executives to a series of pretrial depositions. Trial began six years after the complaint was filed and then it battled in court for another six years. The trial transcript contains over 104,400 pages with thousands of documents placed in the record. It ended on January 8, 1982 when William Baxter, the then Assistant Attorney General in charge of the Antitrust Division of the Department of Justice dropped the case as "without merit."

1969–1981 Private antitrust lawsuits
The U.S.'s 1969 antitrust lawsuit was followed by about 18 private antitrust complaints all but one of which IBM ultimately won. Some notable lawsuits include:

Greyhound Computer Corp.
Greyhound, a leasing company, filed a case under Illinois' state antitrust law in Illinois state court. This case went to trial in federal court in 1972 in Arizona with a directed verdict for IBM on the antitrust claims; however, the court of appeals in 1977 reversed the decision. Just before the retrial was to start in January 1981, IBM and Greyhound settled the case for $17.7 million.

Telex Corp.
Telex, a peripherals equipment manufacturer, filed suit on January 21, 1972, charging that IBM had monopolized and had attempted to monopolize the worldwide manufacture, distribution, sales, and leasing of electronic data processing equipment including the relevant submarket of plug-compatible peripheral devices. After a non-jury trial in 1973, IBM was found guilty "possessing and exercising monopoly power" over the "plug-compatible peripheral equipment market," and ordered to pay triple damages of $352.5‐million and other relief including disclosure of peripheral interface specifications.  Separately Telex was found guilty of misappropriated IBM trade secrets. The judgment against IBM was overturned on appeal and on October 4, 1975, both parties announced they were terminating their actions against each other.

Other private lawsuits
Other private lawsuits ultimately won by IBM include California Computer Products Inc., Memorex Corp., Marshall Industries, Hudson General Corp., Transamerica Corporation and Forro Precision, Inc.

1980–1984 European Union
The European Economic Community Commission on Monopolies initiated proceedings against IBM under article 86 of the Treaty of Rome for exploiting its domination of the continent's computer business and abusing its dominant market position by engaging in business practices designed to protect its position against plug-compatible manufacturers. The case was settled in 1984 with IBM agreeing to change its business practices with regard to disclosure of device interface information.

Products and technologies

See List of IBM products

Evolution of IBM's computer hardware
The story of IBM's hardware is intertwined with the story of the computer industry – from vacuum tubes, to transistors, to integrated circuits, to microprocessors and beyond. The following systems and series represent key steps:
 IBM mainframe – overview
 IBM SSEC – 1948, the first operational machine able to treat its instructions as data
 IBM Card Programmed Calculator – 1949
 IBM 700 series – 1952–1958
 IBM NORC – 1954, the first supercomputer
 IBM 650 – 1954, the world's first mass-produced computer
 SAGE AN/FSQ-7 – 1958, half an acre of floor space, 275 tons, up to three megawatts power consumption, ...the largest computers ever built
 IBM 7000 series – 1959–1964, transistorized evolution of IBM 700 series
 IBM 1400 series – 1959, "...by the mid-1960s nearly half of all computer systems in the world were 1401-type systems."
 IBM System/360 – 1964, the first family of computers designed to cover the complete range of applications, small to large, commercial and scientific
 IBM System/3
 IBM System/370
 IBM System/38
 IBM Series/1
 IBM 801 RISC processor
 IBM PC
 PowerPC
 IBM AS/400, later IBM eServer iSeries, then IBM System i
 IBM RS/6000
 IBM zSeries was earlier IBM System/390
 Cell processor
 IBM Watson (computer)

Components

 History of IBM magnetic disk drives
 Magnetic tape data storage#IBM formats

Evolution of IBM's operating systems

IBM operating systems have paralleled hardware development. On early systems, operating systems represented a relatively modest level of investment, and were essentially viewed as an adjunct to the hardware. By the time of the System/360, however, operating systems had assumed a much larger role, in terms of cost, complexity, importance, and risk.

Mainframe operating systems include:

 OS family, including: OS/360, OS/MFT, OS/MVT, OS/VS1, OS/VS2, MVS, OS/390, z/OS
 DOS family, including: DOS/360, DOS/VS, DOS/VSE, z/VSE
 VM family, including: CP/CMS (See: History of CP/CMS), VM/370, VM/XA, VM/ESA, z/VM
 Special purpose systems, including: TPF, z/TPF

Other significant operating systems include:

 IBM AIX
 IBM i (previously known as OS/400 and i5/OS)
 PowerLinux, Linux on IBM Z

High-level languages
Early IBM computer systems, like those from many other vendors, were programmed using assembly language. Computer science efforts through the 1950s and early 1960s led to the development of many new high-level languages (HLL) for programming. IBM played a complicated role in this process. Hardware vendors were naturally concerned about the implications of portable languages that would allow customers to pick and choose among vendors without compatibility problems. IBM, in particular, helped create barriers that tended to lock customers into a single platform.

Nevertheless, IBM had a significant role in the following major computer languages:
 FORTRAN – for years, the dominant language for mathematics and scientific programming
 PL/I – an attempt to create a "be all and end all" language
 COBOL – eventually the ubiquitous, standard language for business applications
 APL – an early interactive language with a mathematical notation
 PL/S – an internal systems programming language proprietary to IBM
 RPG – an acronym for 'Report Program Generator', developed on the IBM 1401 to produce reports from data files. General Systems Division enhanced the language to HLL status on its midrange systems to rival COBOL.
 SQL – a relational query language developed for IBM's System R; now the standard RDBMS query language
 Rexx – a macro and scripting language based on PL/I syntax originally developed for Conversational Monitor System (CMS) and authored by IBM Fellow Mike Cowlishaw

IBM and AIX/UNIX/Linux/SCO
IBM developed an inconsistent relationship with the UNIX and Linux worlds. The importance of IBM's large computer business placed pressures on all of IBM's attempts to develop other lines of business. All IBM projects faced the risk of being seen as competing against company priorities. This was because, for example, if a customer decided to build an application on an RS/6000 platform, this also meant that a decision had been made against the highly profitable and entrenched mainframe platform. So despite having some excellent technology, IBM often placed itself in a compromised position.

A case in point is IBM's GFIS products for infrastructure management and GIS applications. Despite long having a dominant position in such industries as electric, gas, and water utilities, IBM stumbled in the 1990s trying to build workstation-based solutions to replace its existing mainframe-based products. Some customers moved to new technologies from other vendors; many felt betrayed by IBM.

While IBM better embraced open source technologies in the 1990s, it later became embroiled in a complex litigation with SCO group over intellectual property rights related to the UNIX and Linux platforms.

BICARSA (Billing, Inventory Control, Accounts Receivable, & Sales Analysis)
1983 saw the announcement of the System/36, the replacement for the System/34. And in 1988, IBM announced the AS/400, intended to represent a point of convergence for both System/36 customers and System/38 customers. The 1970s had seen IBM develop a range of Billing, Inventory Control, Accounts Receivable, and Sales Analysis (BICARSA ) applications for specific industries: construction (CMAS), distribution (DMAS), and manufacturing (MMAS), all written in the RPG II language. By the end of the 1980s, IBM had almost completely withdrawn from the BICARSA applications marketplace. Because of developments in the antitrust cases against IBM brought by the US government and European Union, IBM sales representatives were now able to work openly with application software houses as partners. (For a period in the early 1980s, a 'rule of three' operated, which obliged IBM sales representatives, if they were to propose a third-party application to a customer, to also list at least two other third-party vendors in the IBM proposal.)

Non-computer lines of business
IBM has largely been known for its overtaking UNIVAC's early 1950s public fame, then leading in the computer industry for much of the latter part of the century. However, it has also had roles, some significant, in other industries, including:
 IBM was the largest supplier of unit record equipment (punched cards, keypunches, accounting machines, ...) in the first part of the 20th century.
 Food services (meat and coffee grinders, computing cheese slicers, computing scales) – starting in 1934, later sold to Hobart Manufacturing Co.
 Time recorders (punch clocks, school, and factory clocks) – starting in 1958, later sold to Simplex Time Recorder Company. See IBM: History of the Time Equipment Division and its Products and this 1935 catalog – International Time Recording Catalog
 Typewriters, personal printers. See IBM Electric typewriter, IBM Selectric typewriter. IBM divested in 1991, now part of Lexmark.
 Copiers – 1970 to 1988. Sold to Eastman Kodak in 1988.
 Other office products such as dictation machines, word processors.
 Military products (Browning Automatic Rifle, bombsights) – IBM's World War II production
 Digital telephone switches – partnership (1983), acquisition (1984), and sale (1989–1992) of ROLM to Siemens AG
 Stadium scoreboards
 Real estate (at one time owning vast tracts of undeveloped land on the U.S. east coast)
 Medical instruments: heart-lung machine, prostheses, IBM 2991 Blood Cell Washer, IBM 2997 Blood Cell Separator, IBM 5880 Electrocardiograph System

Organization

CEOs, Notable IBMers

List of IBM CEOs
IBM Fellow

For IBM's corporate biographies of former CEOs and many others see: IBM Archives Biographies Builders reference room

IBM Global Services

IBM Research
  See also History of IBM research in Israel

IBM Federal Systems Division (FSD)
A significant part of IBM's operations were FSD's contracts with the U.S. Federal Government for projects ranging from the Department of Defense to the National Security Agency. These projects spanned mundane administrative processing to top-secret supercomputing. In NASA's Apollo Program, the "brains" of each Saturn rocket was the Instrument Unit built by the IBM Space Systems Center in Huntsville, Alabama. Founded in 1957, FSD was sold to Loral in 1994. Among other Federal Systems Division projects was the digitization of the New York Times Morgue (previously published papers) and the New York Times Index which had previously been published annually in print. The project was led by Harlan Mills. The project was notable for delivering the project on time and on budget due to Mill's development of "top down" design and chief programmer teams.

International subsidiaries growth

IBM had subsidiaries and operations in 70 countries in its early years. They included Austria, Belgium, Bulgaria, Czechoslovakia, France, Germany, Italy, Japan, the Netherlands, Norway, Poland, Romania, the Soviet Union, Sweden, Switzerland, Yugoslavia, and others.

IBM service organizations
IBM's early dominance of the computer industry was in part due to its strong professional services activities. IBM's advantage in building software for its own computers eventually was seen as monopolistic, leading to antitrust proceedings. As a result, a complex, artificial "arms-length" relationship was created separating IBM's computer business from its service organizations. This situation persisted for decades. An example was IBM Global Services, a services firm that competed with Electronic Data Systems and Computer Sciences Corporation, among others.

See also

 Category IBM articles

Notes and references

Further reading

Commentary, general histories

For more recent IBM subject books see: IBM#Further reading

 
Boyett, Joseph H.; Schwartz, Stephen; Osterwise, Laurence; Bauer, Roy (1993) The Quality Journey: How winning the Baldrige sparked the remaking of IBM, Dutton
 
 
Engelbourg, Saul (1954) International Business Machines: A Business History, 385pp (doctoral dissertation). Reprinted by Arno, 1976

Foy, Nancy (1975) The Sun Never Sets on IBM, William Morrow, 218pp (published in UK as The IBM World)
IBM (1936) Machine Methods of Accounting This book is constructed from 18 pamphlets, the first of which (AM-01) is Development of International Business Machines Corporation – a 12-page 1936 IBM-written history of IBM.
Malik, R. (1975) And Tomorrow the World: Inside IBM, Millington, 496pp
Mills, D. Quinn (1988) The IBM Lesson: the profitable art of full employment, Times Books, 216pp
Richardson, F.L.W. Jr.; Walker, Charles R. (1948). Human Relations in an Expanding Company. Labor and Management Center Yale University. Reprinted by Arno, 1977.
 
 
 
  – A paperback reprint of IBM: Colossus in Transition.

Technology

For Punched card history, technology, see: Unit record equipment#Further reading
For Herman Hollerith see: Herman Hollerith#Further reading

Baker, Stephen (2012) Final Jeopardy: The Story of Watson, the Computer That Will Transform Our World, Mariner Books
Baldwin, Carliss Y; Clark, Kim B. (2000) Design Rules: The Power of Modularity, vol.1, MIT. unique perspective on the 360 (Tedlow p. 305)
Bashe, Charles J.; Pugh, Emerson W.; Johnson, Lyle R./Palmer, John H. (1986). IBM's Early Computers. MIT Press. .
Chposky, James; Leonsis, Ted (1988). Blue Magic: The People, Power, and Politics Behind The IBM Personal Computer. Facts on File.
Dell, Deborah; Purdy, J. Gerry. ThinkPad: A Different Shade of Blue. Sams.  .
Hsu, Feng-hsiung (2002). Behind Deep Blue: Building the Computer that Defeated the World Chess Champion. Princeton University Press. .
Kelly, Brian W. (2004) Can the AS/400 Survive IBM?, Lets Go
Killen, Michael (1988) IBM: The Making of the Common View, Harcourt Brace Jovanovich 
Mills, H.D.,  O'Neill, D., Linger, R.C., Dyer, M., Quinnan, R.E. (1980) The Management of Software Engineering, IBM Systems Journal (SJ), Vol. 19,  No. 4, 1980, pp. 414–77 http://www.research.ibm.com/journal/sj/
Pugh, Emerson W. (1995). Building IBM: Shaping and Industry and Its Technology. MIT Press. .
Pugh, Emerson W.; Johnson, Lyle R.; Palmer, John H. (1991). IBM's 360 and Early 370 Systems. MIT Press. .

Soltis, Frank G. (2002) Fortress Rochester: The Inside Story of the IBM iSeries, 29th Street Press
Yost, Jeffrey R. (2011) The IBM Century: Creating the IT Revolution, IEEE Computer Society

Locations – plants, labs, divisions, countries

DeLoca, Cornelius E.; Kalow, Samuel J. (1991) The Romance Division ... a different side of IBM , D & K Book, 223pp (history, strategy, key people in Electric Typewriter and successor Office Products Div)
France, Boyd (1961) IBM in France, Washington National Planning Assoc
Harvey, John (2008) Transition The IBM Story, Switzer (IBM IT services in Australia)
Heide, Lars (2002) National Capital in the Emergence of a Challenger to IBM in France
Jardine, Diane (ed) (2002) IBM @ 70: Blue Beneath the Southern Cross. Celebrating 70 Years of IBM in Australia, Focus
Joseph, Allan (2010) Masked Intentions: Navigating a Computer Embargo on China, Trafford, 384pp
Meredith, Suzanne; Aswad, Ed (2005) IBM in Endicott, Arcadia, 128pp
Norberg, Arthur L.; Yost, Jeffrey R. (2006) IBM Rochester: A Half Century of Innovation, IBM
Robinson, William Louis (2008) IBM's Shadow Force: The Untold Story of Federal Systems, The Secretive Giant that Safeguarded America, Thomas Max, 224pp

Biographies, memoirs

For IBM's corporate biographies of former CEOs and many others see: IBM Archives Biographies Builders reference room

Amonette, Ruth Leach (1999). Among Equals, A Memoir: The Rise of IBM's First Woman Vice President. Creative Arts Book Company. .
Beardsley, Max (2001) International Business Marionettes: An IBM Executive Struggles to Regain His Sanity after a Brutal Firing, Lucky Press
Birkenstock, James W. (1999). Pioneering: On the Frontier of Electronic Data Processing, A Personal Memoir, self-published, 72pp
Lewis M. Branscomb#Books by Lewis Branscomb
Drandell, Milton (1990) IBM: The Other Side, 101 Former Employees Look Back, Quail
Charles Ranlett Flint#Bibliography
Louis V. Gerstner Jr.#References 
Gould, Heywood (1971). Corporation Freak, Tower, 174pp ("...hired as an audio-visual consultant by the Advanced Systems Development Division ...")
Herman Hollerith#Further reading
Lamassonne, Luis A. (2001). My Life With IBM. Protea. .
Maisonrouge, Jacques (1985). Inside IBM: A Personal Story. McGraw Hill. .
William W. Simmons#Selected publications
Ulrich Steinhilper#IBM and later life
Thomas, Charles (1993) Black and Blue: Profiles of Blacks in IBM, Atlanta Aaron, 181pp
Thomas J. Watson#Further reading
Thomas Watson Jr.#Further reading
Williamson, Gordon R. (2009) Memoirs of My Years with IBM: 1951–1986, Xlibris, 768pp

External links
 IBM Archives, History of IBM 
 IBM at 100 – IBM reviews and reflects on its first 100 years
 THINK: Our History of Progress; 1890s to 2001.  IBM
 Oral History with James W. Birkenstock, Charles Babbage Institute, University of Minnesota. Birkenstock was an adviser to the president and subsequently as Director of Product Planning and Market Analysis at IBM. In this oral history, Birkenstock discusses the metamorphosis of the company from leader of the tabulating machine industry to leader of the data processing industry. He describes his involvement with magnetic tape development in 1947, the involvement of IBM in the Korean War, the development of the IBM 701 computer (known internally as the Defense Calculator), and the emergence of magnetic core memory from the SAGE project. He then recounts the entry of IBM into the commercial computer market with the IBM 702. The end of the interview concerns IBM's relationship with other early entrants in the international computer industry, including litigation with Sperry Rand, its cross-licensing agreements, and cooperation with Japanese electronics firms.

History
History of computer companies
History of computing hardware
History of companies of the United States